= Public (restaurant) =

Defunct restaurant in New York City, U.S.

- Interactive map of Public

Restaurant information
- Established: 2003
- Closed: June 3, 2017
- Location: 210 Elizabeth Street, New York City, New York, 10012, United States
- Coordinates: 40°43′20″N 73°59′39″W

Public was a restaurant in New York City. It had received a Michelin star before closing. The restaurant had opened in 2003.

== See also ==
- List of defunct restaurants of the United States
- List of Michelin-starred restaurants in New York City
