= Sushi Azabu =

Japanese restaurant in New York City, U.S.

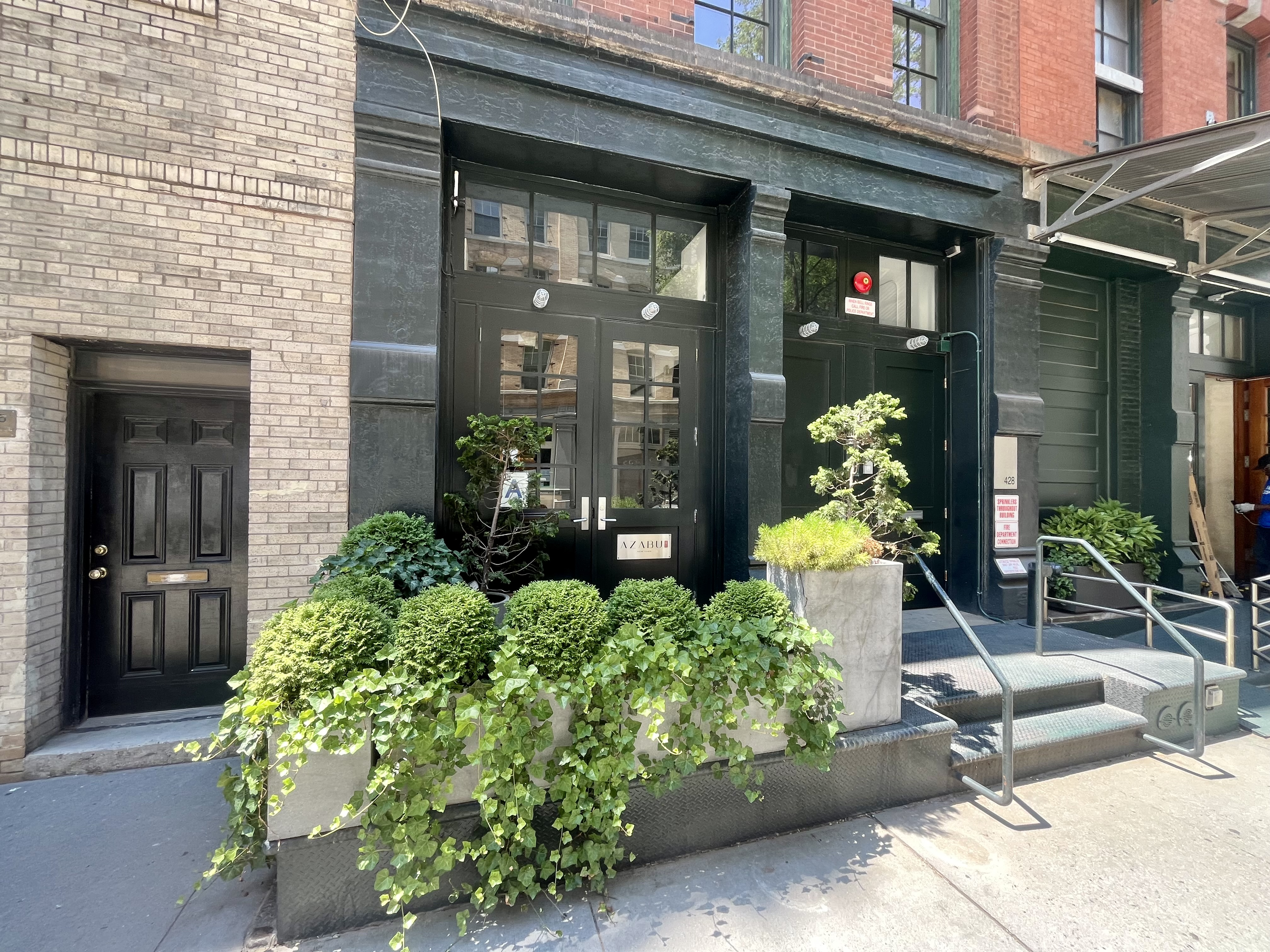
- The restaurant's exterior in 2024
- Interactive map of Sushi Azabu

Restaurant information
- Established: 2008
- Food type: Japanese
- Location: 428 Greenwich Street, New York City, New York, 10013, United States
- Coordinates: 40°43′20.8″N 74°0′35.6″W
- Website: sushi-azabu.com

Sushi Azabu is a Japanese restaurant in New York City. The restaurant serves sushi and has received a Michelin star.

== See also ==
- List of Japanese restaurants
- List of Michelin-starred restaurants in New York City
