= One White Street =

Restaurant in New York City

- Interactive map of One White Street

Restaurant information
- Established: August 5, 2021
- Food type: American
- Location: One White Street, New York City, New York, 10013, United States
- Coordinates: 40°43′9.5″N 74°0′21.5″W
- Website: Official website

One White Street is a restaurant in New York City. The restaurant serves American cuisine and has received a Michelin star. They were also awarded the Michelin Green Star, an award for restaurants with sustainable practices, in 2024.

== See also ==
- List of Michelin-starred restaurants in New York City
