= Jeju Noodle Bar =

Korean restaurant in New York City, U.S.

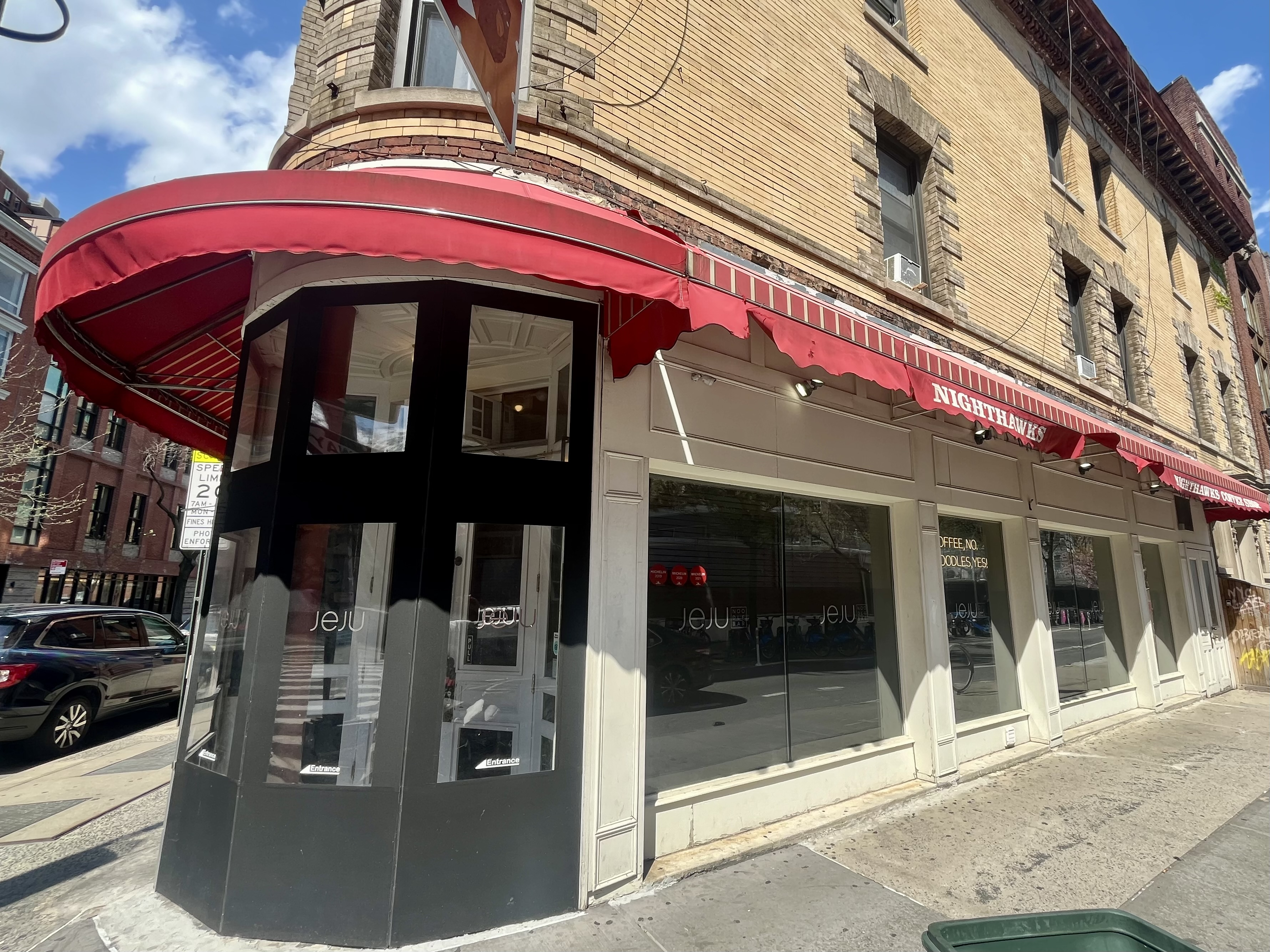
- The restaurant's exterior in April 2024
- Interactive map of Jeju Noodle Bar

Restaurant information
- Established: September 11, 2017
- Location: 679 Greenwich Street, New York City, New York, 10014, United States
- Coordinates: 40°43′59″N 74°0′26″W

Jeju Noodle Bar is a Korean restaurant in New York City. The restaurant has received a Michelin star.

== See also ==
- List of Korean restaurants
- List of Michelin-starred restaurants in New York City
