= Anthos (restaurant) =

Defunct Greek restaurant in New York City, U.S.

- Interactive map of Anthos

Restaurant information
- Established: August 2010
- Food type: Greek
- Location: 36 West 52nd Street, New York City, New York, 10019, United States
- Coordinates: 40°45′37.1″N 73°58′40.4″W

Anthos was a Greek restaurant in New York City. The restaurant had received a Michelin star.

== See also ==
- List of defunct restaurants of the United States
- List of Greek restaurants
- List of Michelin-starred restaurants in New York City
