= Sushi Noz =

Japanese restaurant in New York City

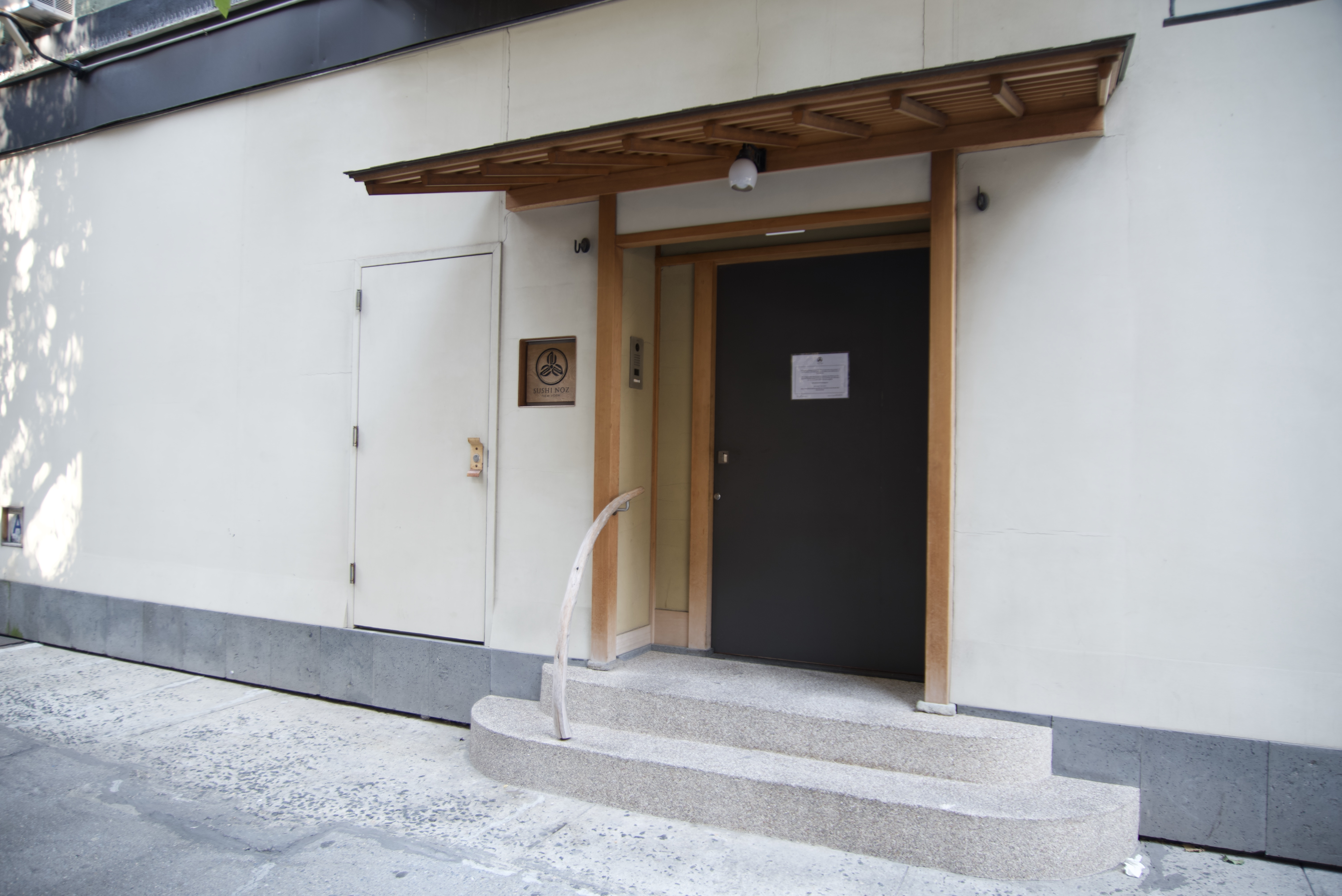
- Interactive map of Sushi Noz

Restaurant information
- Established: March 30, 2018
- Head chef: Nozomu Abe
- Food type: Japanese
- Rating: (Michelin Guide)
- Location: 181 East 78th Street, New York, New York, 10075
- Coordinates: 40°46′25.9″N 73°57′29.3″W
- Seating capacity: 14 (8-seat and 6-seat counters)
- Website: www.sushinoz.com

Sushi Noz is a Japanese restaurant located in the Upper East Side neighborhood in New York City. The restaurant serves sushi and has received a Michelin star. In 2023, its Michelin rating was increased to two stars.

== Description ==
The restaurant specializes in Edomae-style sushi and features a design influenced by Kyoto’s Sukiya architecture. The menu includes offerings such as amadai (tilefish) with shiso flowers and ginkgo nuts, chutoro (medium fatty tuna) from Miyazaki, and bafun uni (Hokkaido sea urchin). Notable dishes include anago (saltwater eel) smoked over bamboo leaves and finished with a house-made tsume sauce. Sushi Noz provides two beverage pairing options: the Signature Pairing and the Prestige Pairing.

== History ==
Sushi Noz was founded by Chef Nozomu Abe, a native of Hokkaido, Japan in 2018. After training in Sapporo and Tokyo under master chefs, Chef Noz moved to New York in 2007, where he worked at the renowned Sushiden before opening Sushi Noz in 2018.

The restaurant reflects the style of Kyoto temples, featuring Sukiya architecture. Its centerpiece is a 200-year-old Hinoki wood sushi counter, complemented by various cedar wood elements joined without nails and a traditional hinoki ice chest for fish preservation.

== Policies ==
Reservations at Sushi Noz are required and must be made online, with seatings offered four times daily from Monday to Saturday. The restaurant enforces a strict cancellation policy, with a $100 per person deposit forfeited unless cancellations or rescheduling requests are made at least 72 hours in advance.

Sushi Noz accommodates limited dietary restrictions, though the restaurant may be unable to cater to vegetarian, gluten-free, or kosher diets, as well as allergies to shellfish and soy. Guests may also bring their own wine for a corkage fee of $120 per bottle or $220 per magnum, subject to approval.

== Reception ==
Sushi Noz received a Michelin star in 2020 and in 2023 the restaurant was awarded 2 Michelin stars.

== See also ==
- List of Japanese restaurants
- List of Michelin-starred restaurants in New York City
