= A Voce Columbus =

Defunct restaurant in New York City, U.S.

- Interactive map of A Voce Columbus

Restaurant information
- Closed: August 2016
- Food type: Italian
- Location: 10 Columbus Circle, New York City, New York, 10019, United States
- Coordinates: 40°46′5″N 73°58′59″W

A Voce Columbus was an Italian restaurant in New York City. The restaurant had received a Michelin star.

== See also ==
- List of defunct restaurants of the United States
- List of Michelin-starred restaurants in New York City
