= Allen & Delancey =

Defunct restaurant in New York City, United States

- Interactive map of Allen & Delancey

Restaurant information
- Food type: Contemporary European
- Location: 115 Allen Street, New York City, New York, 10002, United States
- Coordinates: 40°43′10.6″N 73°59′25.8″W

Allen & Delancey was a restaurant in New York City.

The restaurant had received a Michelin star, before closing.

== See also ==
- List of defunct restaurants of the United States
- List of Michelin-starred restaurants in New York City
