= Semilla =

Defunct restaurant in New York City, U.S.

- Interactive map of Semilla

Restaurant information
- Established: 2014
- Closed: 2017
- Owner: José Ramírez-Ruiz
- Chef: José Ramírez-Ruiz
- Pastry chef: Pamela Yung
- Food type: American
- Location: 160 Havemeyer Street, Brooklyn, New York, 11211, United States
- Coordinates: 40°42′41.3″N 73°57′28″W

Semilla was a restaurant in Williamsburg, Brooklyn, in the U.S. state of New York. The business operated from 2014 to 2017. José Ramírez-Ruiz was the chef and owner. Semilla served American cuisine and had received a Michelin star.

== See also ==
- List of defunct restaurants of the United States
- List of Michelin-starred restaurants in New York City
