= Rebelle (restaurant) =

Defunct restaurant in New York City, U.S.

- Interactive map of Rebelle

Restaurant information
- Established: April 20, 2015
- Closed: November 18, 2017
- Location: 218 Bowery, New York City, New York, 10012, United States
- Coordinates: 40°43′19″N 73°59′37.3″W

Rebelle was a restaurant in New York City. The restaurant had received a Michelin star.

== See also ==
- List of defunct restaurants of the United States
- List of Michelin-starred restaurants in New York City
