= Noda (restaurant) =

Japanese restaurant in New York City

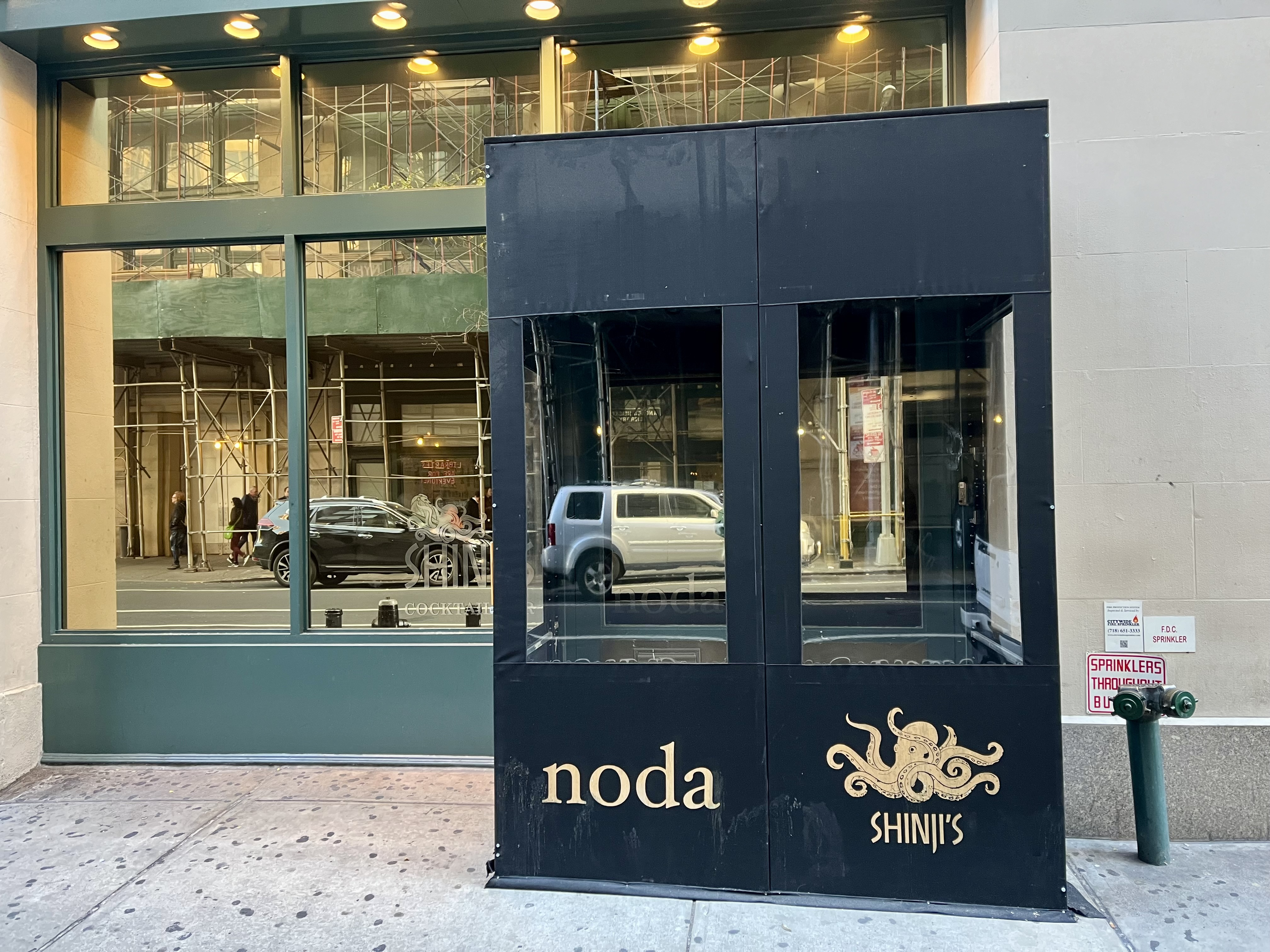
- Noda in November 2023
- Interactive map of Noda

Restaurant information
- Established: 2018
- Head chef: Shigeyuki Tsunoda
- Food type: Japanese
- Rating: Michelin Guide:
- Location: 37 West 20th Street, New York City, New York, 10011
- Coordinates: 40°44′26.7″N 73°59′35.4″W
- Website: noda.nyc

Noda is a Japanese restaurant in the Flatiron District of Manhattan in New York City. The restaurant has received a Michelin star.

== See also ==
- List of Japanese restaurants
- List of Michelin-starred restaurants in New York City
