= L'Abeille =

Restaurant in New York City

l'abeille
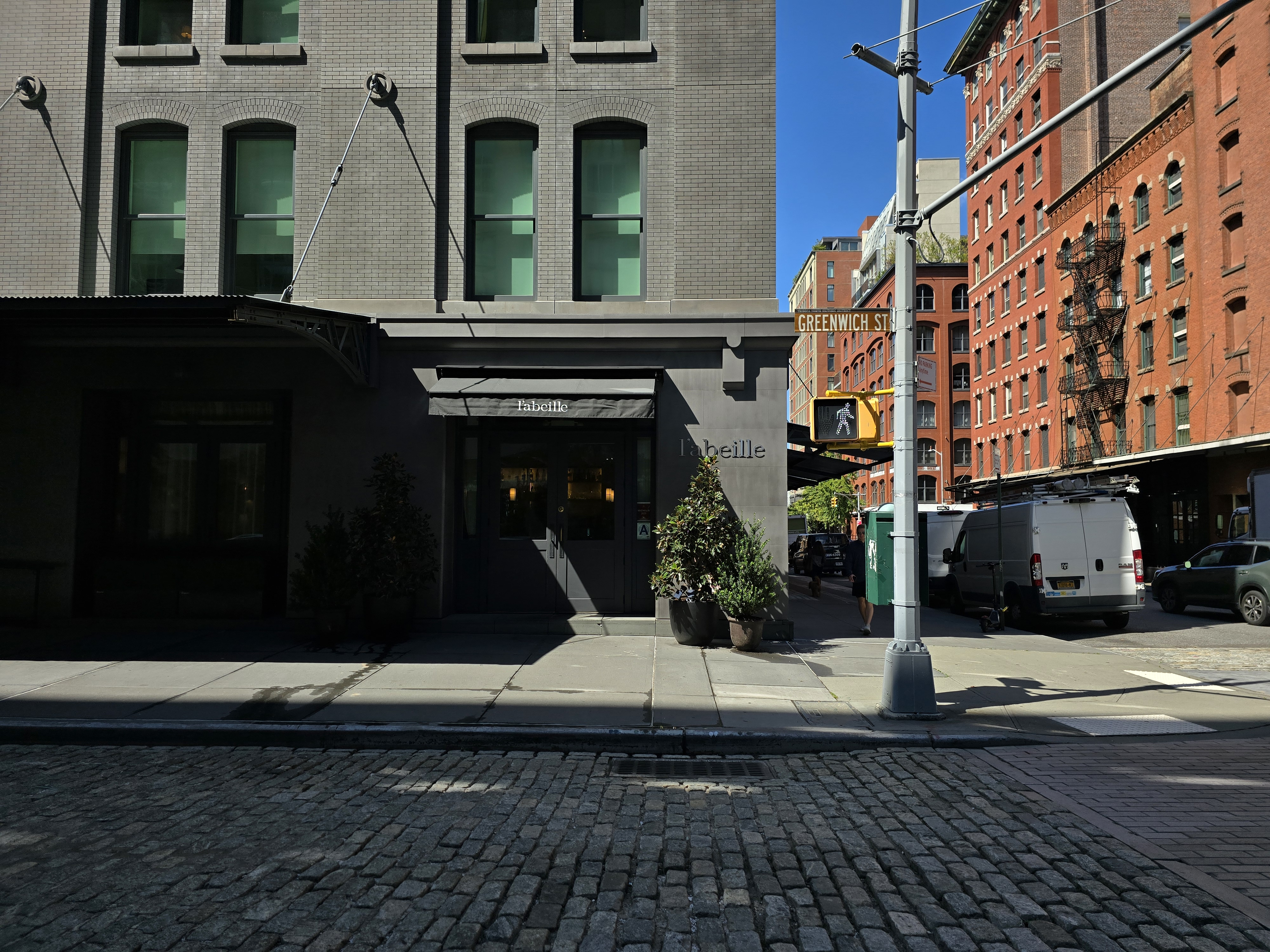
- Interactive map of l'abeille

Restaurant information
- Established: March 2022
- Head chef: Mitsunobu Nagae
- Food type: French
- Dress code: Elegant
- Location: 412 Greenwich Street, New York, New York, 10013, USA
- Coordinates: 40°43′18.8″N 74°0′35.8″W
- Seating capacity: 48
- Reservations: https://resy.com/cities/ny/labielle
- Website: https://www.labeille.nyc

L'Abeille (stylized l'abeille) is a Michelin-starred restaurant in New York City. The restaurant's name means "bee" in French, a reference to chef Mitsunobu Nagae's childhood nickname, Mitsu, the Japanese word for honey. The restaurant opened in March 2022.

== See also ==
- List of Michelin-starred restaurants in New York City
