= Fleur de Sel =

Defunct restaurant in New York City, U.S.

- Interactive map of Fleur de Sel

Restaurant information
- Established: 2000
- Closed: February 21, 2009
- Location: 5 East 20th Street, New York City, New York, 10003, United States
- Coordinates: 40°44′22.4″N 73°59′25.2″W

Fleur de Sel was a restaurant in the Flatiron District of Manhattan in New York City. It had received a Michelin star.

The restaurant closed in 2009.

== See also ==
- List of defunct restaurants of the United States
- List of Michelin-starred restaurants in New York City
