= Kosaka (restaurant) =

Japanese restaurant in New York City

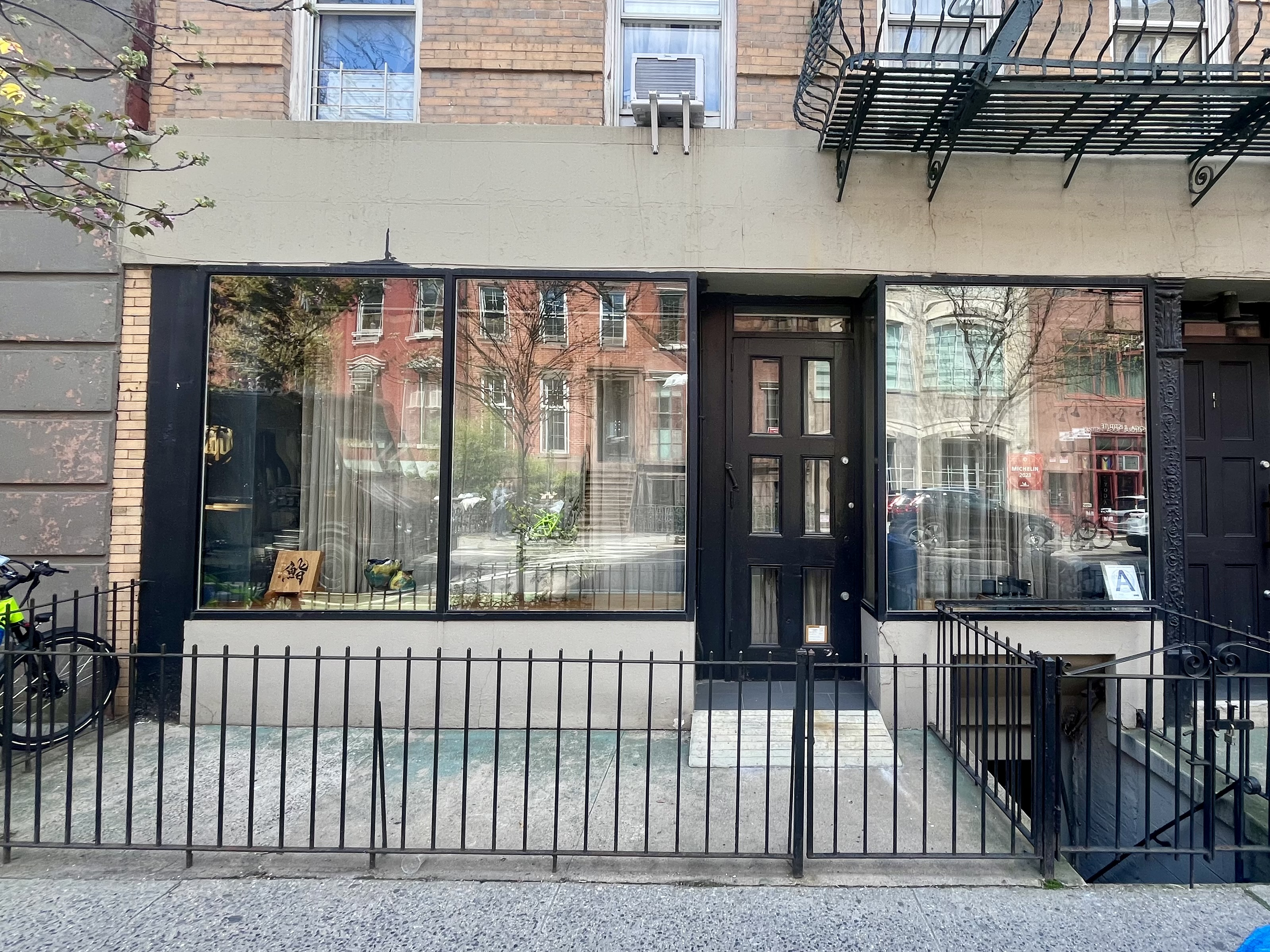
- Kosaka in April 2024
- Interactive map of Kosaka

Restaurant information
- Established: December 2015
- Head chef: Masatomo Soma
- Food type: Japanese
- Rating: (Michelin Guide)
- Location: 220 West 13th Street, New York City, New York, 10011, United States
- Coordinates: 40°44′17.9″N 74°0′5.1″W
- Website: Official website

Kosaka is a Japanese restaurant in New York City. The restaurant has received a Michelin star. Time Out New York has rated Kosaka 2 out of 5 stars.

== See also ==
- List of Japanese restaurants
- List of Michelin-starred restaurants in New York City
