= Tempura Matsui =

Japanese restaurant in New York City, U.S.

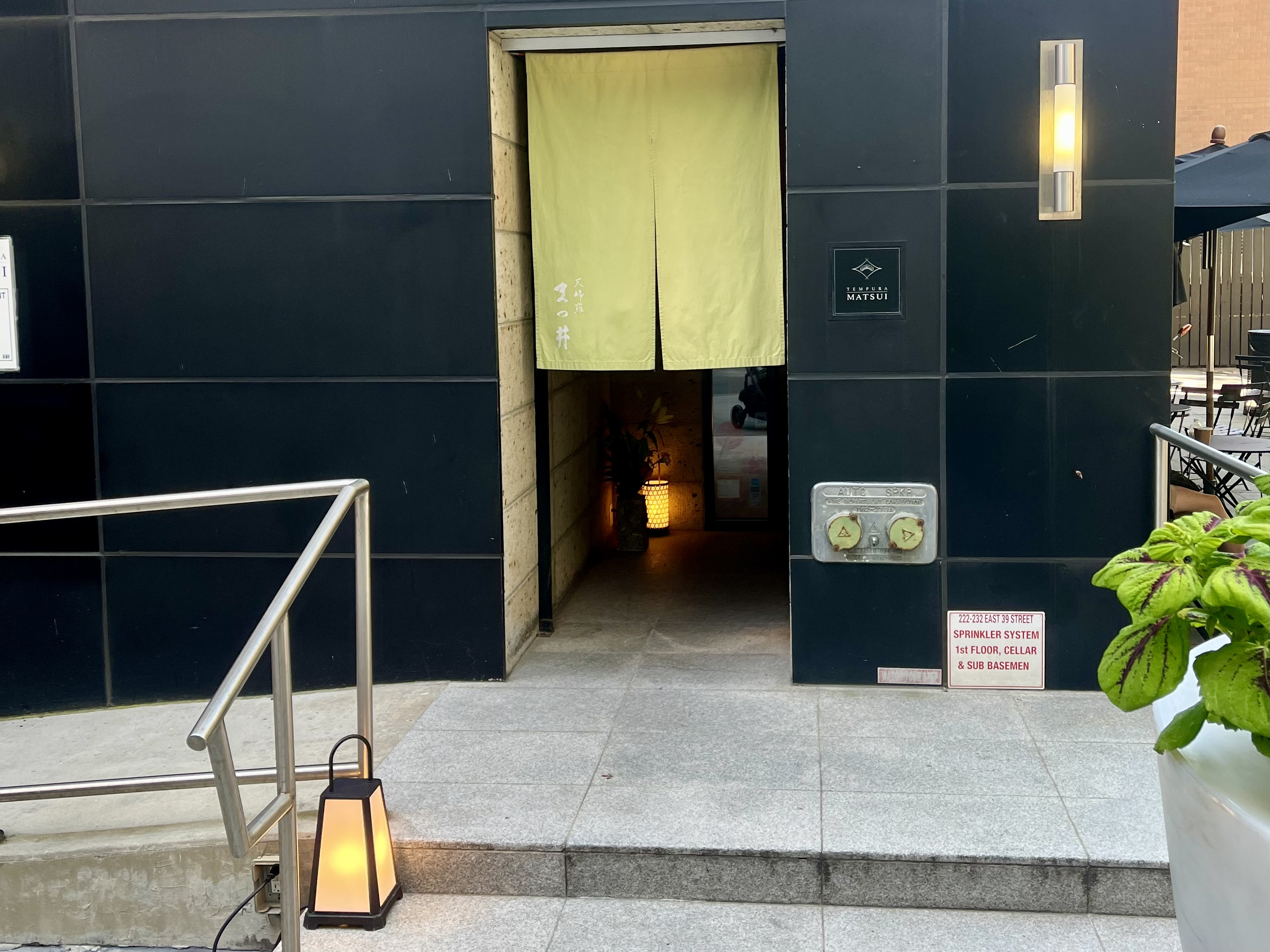
- The restaurant's exterior in 2023
- Interactive map of Tempura Matsui

Restaurant information
- Established: July 14, 2015
- Food type: Japanese
- Rating: 1 Michelin star
- Location: 222 East 39th Street, New York City, New York, 10016, United States
- Coordinates: 40°44′54″N 73°58′29.5″W
- Website: tempuramatsui.com

Tempura Matsui is a Japanese restaurant in New York City. The restaurant has received a Michelin star.

== See also ==
- List of Japanese restaurants
- List of Michelin-starred restaurants in New York City
