= List of Michelin-starred restaurants in New York City =

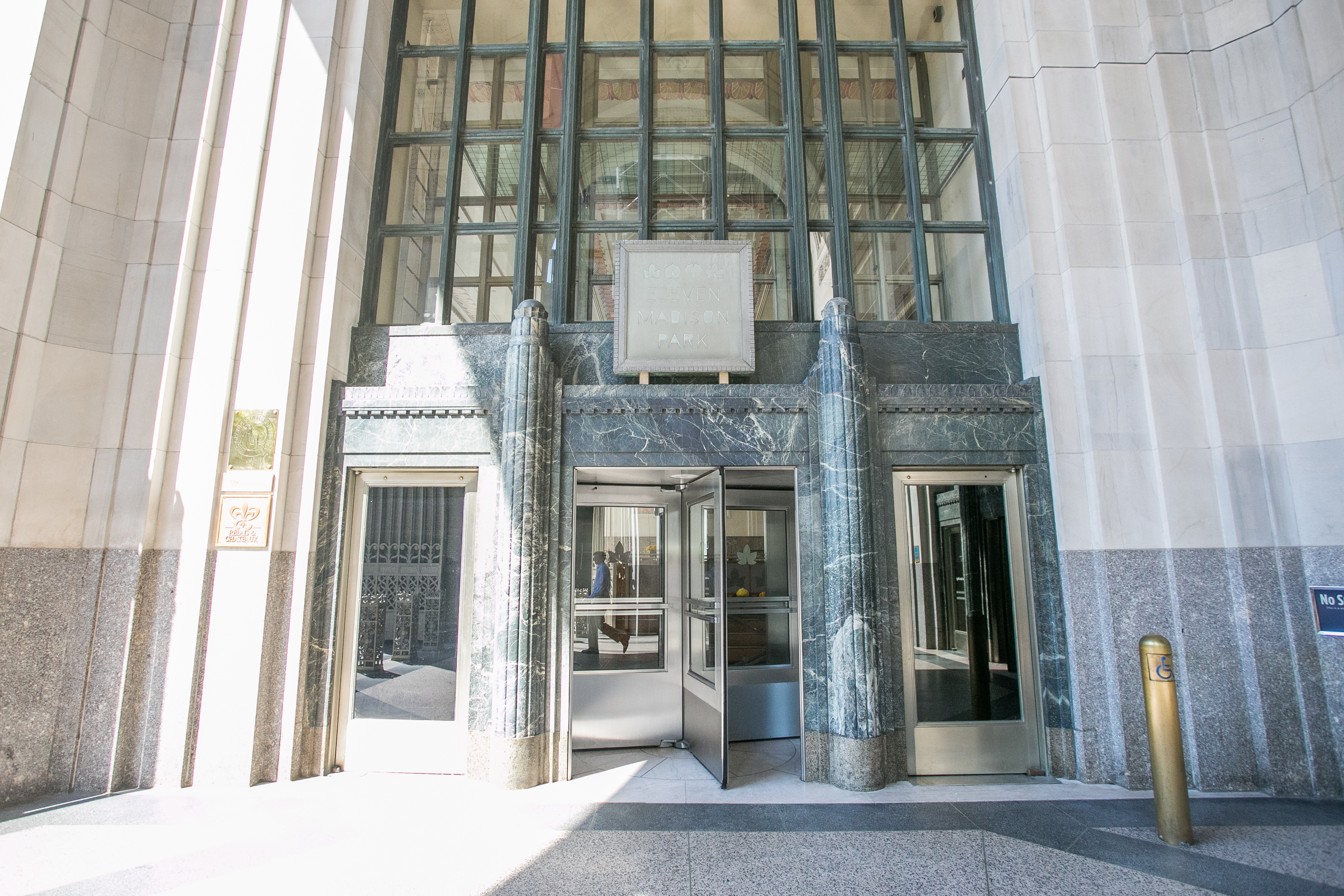
Eleven Madison Park, a 3 Michelin-starred restaurant in New York City

As of the 2025 guide, there are 72 restaurants in New York City and its environs that hold a Michelin star.

The Michelin Guides have been published by the French tire company Michelin since 1900. They were designed as a guide to tell drivers about eateries they recommended to visit and to subtly sponsor their tires, by encouraging drivers to use their cars more and therefore need to replace the tires as they wore out. Over time, the stars that were given out started to become more valuable.

Multiple anonymous Michelin inspectors visit the restaurants several times. They rate the restaurants on five criteria: "quality of products", "mastery of flavor and cooking techniques", "the personality of the chef represented in the dining experience", "value for money", and "consistency between inspectors' visits". Inspectors have at least ten years of expertise and create a list of popular restaurants supported by media reports, reviews, and diner popularity. If they reach a consensus, Michelin awards restaurants from one to three stars based on its evaluation methodology: One star means "high-quality cooking, worth a stop", two stars signify "excellent cooking, worth a detour", and three stars denote "exceptional cuisine, worth a special journey". The stars are not permanent and restaurants are constantly being re-evaluated. If the criteria are not met, the restaurant will lose its stars.

The 2006 edition was the first edition of the Michelin Guide to New York City to be published. It was the first time that Michelin published a Red Guide for a region outside Europe. In the 2020 edition, the Guide began to include restaurants outside the city's five boroughs, adding Westchester County restaurants to its listing.

In 2025, Michelin merged New York's list with those of Chicago and Washington, D.C., and incorporated newly added coverage of Boston and Philadelphia, into one larger list titled MICHELIN Guide Northeast Cities.

== 2021–2025 lists ==
Key
1 Michelin star	One Michelin star
2 Michelin stars	Two Michelin stars
3 Michelin stars	Three Michelin stars
—	The restaurant did not receive a star that year
Closed	The restaurant is no longer open

Michelin-starred restaurants
Name	Cuisine	Location	2021	2022	2023	2024	2025
63 Clinton	Contemporary	Manhattan – Lower East Side	—	1 Michelin star	1 Michelin star	1 Michelin star	1 Michelin star
Ai Fiori	Italian	Manhattan – Midtown South	1 Michelin star	—	—	—	—
Al Coro	Italian	Manhattan – Chelsea	—	2 Michelin stars	2 Michelin stars	Closed	
Aquavit	Scandinavian	Manhattan – Midtown East	2 Michelin stars	2 Michelin stars	2 Michelin stars	2 Michelin stars	2 Michelin stars
Aska	Scandinavian	Brooklyn – Williamsburg	2 Michelin stars	2 Michelin stars	2 Michelin stars	2 Michelin stars	2 Michelin stars
Atera	Contemporary	Manhattan – Tribeca	2 Michelin stars	2 Michelin stars	2 Michelin stars	2 Michelin stars	2 Michelin stars
Atomix	Korean	Manhattan – Flatiron District	2 Michelin stars	2 Michelin stars	2 Michelin stars	2 Michelin stars	2 Michelin stars
Bâtard	French	Manhattan – Tribeca	1 Michelin star	1 Michelin star	Closed		
Bar Miller	Japanese	Manhattan – Alphabet City	—	—	—	1 Michelin star	1 Michelin star
Benno	Mediterranean	Manhattan – NoMad	1 Michelin star	Closed			
Blanca	Contemporary	Brooklyn – Bushwick	2 Michelin stars	Temporarily Closed		—	Closed
Family Meal at Blue Hill	American	Manhattan – Greenwich Village	1 Michelin star	1 Michelin star	1 Michelin star	1 Michelin star	1 Michelin star
Blue Hill at Stone Barns	American	Westchester – Tarrytown	2 Michelin stars	2 Michelin stars	2 Michelin stars	2 Michelin stars	2 Michelin stars
bōm	Korean	Manhattan – Flatiron District	—	—	1 Michelin star	1 Michelin star	1 Michelin star
Bridges	Contemporary	Manhattan – Chinatown	—	—	—	—	1 Michelin star
Café Boulud	French	Manhattan – Upper East Side	—	—	—	1 Michelin star	1 Michelin star
Carbone	Italian	Manhattan – Greenwich Village	1 Michelin star	—	—	—	—
Casa Enrique	Mexican	Queens – Long Island City	1 Michelin star	1 Michelin star	—	—	—
Casa Mono	Spanish	Manhattan – Gramercy Park	1 Michelin star	1 Michelin star	1 Michelin star	1 Michelin star	1 Michelin star
Caviar Russe	Contemporary	Manhattan – Midtown East	1 Michelin star	1 Michelin star	1 Michelin star	—	—
César	Contemporary	Manhattan – Hudson Square	—	—	—	2 Michelin stars	2 Michelin stars
Chef's Table at Brooklyn Fare	Contemporary	Manhattan – Hell's Kitchen	3 Michelin stars	3 Michelin stars	—	2 Michelin stars	2 Michelin stars
Claro	Mexican	Brooklyn – Boerum Hill	1 Michelin star	1 Michelin star	—	—	—
Clover Hill	Contemporary	Brooklyn – Brooklyn Heights	—	1 Michelin star	1 Michelin star	1 Michelin star	Closed
Contra	Contemporary	Manhattan – Lower East Side	1 Michelin star	1 Michelin star	Closed		
Corima	Mexican	Manhattan – Chinatown	—	—	—	1 Michelin star	1 Michelin star
Cote	Korean	Manhattan – Flatiron District	1 Michelin star	1 Michelin star	1 Michelin star	1 Michelin star	1 Michelin star
Crown Shy	Contemporary	Manhattan – Financial District	1 Michelin star	1 Michelin star	1 Michelin star	1 Michelin star	1 Michelin star
Daniel	French	Manhattan – Upper East Side	2 Michelin stars	2 Michelin stars	2 Michelin stars	1 Michelin star	1 Michelin star
Dirt Candy	Vegetarian	Manhattan – Lower East Side	—	1 Michelin star	1 Michelin star	1 Michelin star	1 Michelin star
Don Angie	Italian	Manhattan – West Village	1 Michelin star	1 Michelin star	—	—	—
Eleven Madison Park	Contemporary (Note: The menu changed to all-vegan upon reopening after the COVID-19 pandemic but after 4 years changed back to Contemporary cuisine in Aug 2025)	Manhattan – Midtown South	3 Michelin stars	3 Michelin stars	3 Michelin stars	3 Michelin stars	3 Michelin stars
Essential by Christophe	French	Manhattan – Upper West Side	—	—	1 Michelin star	1 Michelin star	1 Michelin star
Estela	Contemporary	Manhattan – Nolita	1 Michelin star	1 Michelin star	1 Michelin star	1 Michelin star	1 Michelin star
Francie	Contemporary	Brooklyn – Williamsburg	1 Michelin star	1 Michelin star	1 Michelin star	1 Michelin star	1 Michelin star
Frevo	Contemporary	Manhattan – Greenwich Village	—	1 Michelin star	1 Michelin star	1 Michelin star	1 Michelin star
Gabriel Kreuther	Alsatian	Manhattan – Midtown West	2 Michelin stars	2 Michelin stars	2 Michelin stars	2 Michelin stars	2 Michelin stars
Gramercy Tavern	Contemporary	Manhattan – Flatiron District	1 Michelin star	1 Michelin star	1 Michelin star	1 Michelin star	1 Michelin star
Hirohisa	Japanese	Manhattan – SoHo	1 Michelin star	1 Michelin star	1 Michelin star	—	—
Huso	Contemporary	Manhattan – Tribeca	—	—	—	—	1 Michelin star
Icca	Japanese	Manhattan – Tribeca	—	1 Michelin star	1 Michelin star	1 Michelin star	1 Michelin star
Ichimura at Uchū	Japanese	Manhattan – Lower East Side	2 Michelin stars	Closed			
Jean-Georges	Contemporary	Manhattan – Columbus Circle	2 Michelin stars	2 Michelin stars	2 Michelin stars	2 Michelin stars	2 Michelin stars
Jeju Noodle Bar	Korean	Manhattan – West Village	1 Michelin star	1 Michelin star	1 Michelin star	1 Michelin star	1 Michelin star
Jōji	Japanese	Manhattan – Midtown East	—	—	1 Michelin star	1 Michelin star	1 Michelin star
Joomak Banjum	Korean	Manhattan – Midtown South	—	1 Michelin star	1 Michelin star	Closed	
Joo Ok	Korean	Manhattan – Koreatown	—	—	—	1 Michelin star	2 Michelin stars
Jua	Korean	Manhattan – Flatiron District	1 Michelin star	1 Michelin star	1 Michelin star	1 Michelin star	1 Michelin star
Jungsik	Korean	Manhattan – Tribeca	2 Michelin stars	2 Michelin stars	2 Michelin stars	3 Michelin stars	3 Michelin stars
Kajitsu	Japanese	Manhattan – Murray Hill	1 Michelin star	Closed			
Kanoyama	Japanese	Manhattan – East Village	1 Michelin star	1 Michelin star	—	—	—
Kochi	Korean	Manhattan – Midtown West	1 Michelin star	1 Michelin star	1 Michelin star	1 Michelin star	1 Michelin star
Kosaka	Japanese	Manhattan – West Village	1 Michelin star	1 Michelin star	1 Michelin star	1 Michelin star	1 Michelin star
L'Abeille	French	Manhattan – Tribeca	—	1 Michelin star	1 Michelin star	1 Michelin star	1 Michelin star
L'Appart	French	Manhattan – Financial District	1 Michelin star	—	—	Closed	
L'Atelier de Joël Robuchon	French	Manhattan – Chelsea	2 Michelin stars	Closed			
La Bastide by Andrea Calstier	French	Westchester – North Salem	—	—	—	1 Michelin star	1 Michelin star
Le Bernardin	Seafood	Manhattan – Midtown West	3 Michelin stars	3 Michelin stars	3 Michelin stars	3 Michelin stars	3 Michelin stars
Le Coucou	French	Manhattan – SoHo	1 Michelin star	1 Michelin star	1 Michelin star	1 Michelin star	1 Michelin star
Le Jardinier	French	Manhattan – Midtown East	1 Michelin star	1 Michelin star	1 Michelin star	—	—
Le Pavillon	Contemporary	Manhattan – Midtown East	—	1 Michelin star	1 Michelin star	1 Michelin star	1 Michelin star
Mari	Korean	Manhattan – Hell's Kitchen	—	1 Michelin star	1 Michelin star	1 Michelin star	1 Michelin star
Marea	Seafood, Italian	Manhattan – Midtown West	1 Michelin star	—	—	—	—
Masa	Japanese	Manhattan – Columbus Circle	3 Michelin stars	3 Michelin stars	3 Michelin stars	3 Michelin stars	2 Michelin stars
Meadowsweet	Mediterranean	Brooklyn – Williamsburg	1 Michelin star	—	—	—	—
Meju	Korean	Queens – Hunters Point	—	—	1 Michelin star	1 Michelin star	1 Michelin star
Momofuku Ko	Asian	Manhattan – East Village	2 Michelin stars	2 Michelin stars	Closed		
Muku	Japanese	Manhattan – Tribeca	—	—	—	—	1 Michelin star
Noda	Japanese	Manhattan – Flatiron District	1 Michelin star	1 Michelin star	1 Michelin star	1 Michelin star	1 Michelin star
Noksu	Korean	Manhattan – Koreatown	—	—	—	1 Michelin star	1 Michelin star
Noz 17	Japanese	Manhattan – Chelsea	—	1 Michelin star	1 Michelin star	1 Michelin star	1 Michelin star
Odo	Japanese	Manhattan – Flatiron District	1 Michelin star	1 Michelin star	2 Michelin stars	2 Michelin stars	2 Michelin stars
Oiji Mi	Korean	Manhattan – Flatiron District	—	1 Michelin star	1 Michelin star	1 Michelin star	1 Michelin star
One White Street	Contemporary	Manhattan – Tribeca	—	1 Michelin star	1 Michelin star	1 Michelin star	—
Oxalis	Contemporary	Brooklyn – Prospect Heights	1 Michelin star	1 Michelin star	Closed		
Oxomoco	Mexican	Brooklyn – Williamsburg	1 Michelin star	1 Michelin star	1 Michelin star	1 Michelin star	1 Michelin star
Per Se	Contemporary	Manhattan – Columbus Circle	3 Michelin stars	3 Michelin stars	3 Michelin stars	3 Michelin stars	3 Michelin stars
Peter Luger Steak House	Steakhouse	Brooklyn – Williamsburg	1 Michelin star	—	—	—	—
Red Paper Clip	Chinese	Manhattan – West Village	—	1 Michelin star	1 Michelin star	1 Michelin star	—
Restaurant Yuu	French	Brooklyn – Williamsburg	—	—	1 Michelin star	1 Michelin star	1 Michelin star
Rezdôra	Italian	Manhattan – Flatiron District	1 Michelin star	1 Michelin star	1 Michelin star	1 Michelin star	1 Michelin star
Saga	Contemporary	Manhattan – Financial District	—	2 Michelin stars	2 Michelin stars	2 Michelin stars	2 Michelin stars
Semma	South Indian	Manhattan – Greenwich Village	—	1 Michelin star	1 Michelin star	1 Michelin star	1 Michelin star
Shion 69 Leonard Street	Japanese	Manhattan – Tribeca	—	1 Michelin star	1 Michelin star	1 Michelin star	1 Michelin star
Shmoné	Israeli	Manhattan – Greenwich Village	—	—	1 Michelin star	1 Michelin star	1 Michelin star
Shota Omakase	Japanese	Brooklyn – Williamsburg	—	—	—	1 Michelin star	1 Michelin star
Sushi Amane	Japanese	Manhattan – Turtle Bay	1 Michelin star	1 Michelin star	1 Michelin star	1 Michelin star	—
Sushi Ginza Onodera	Japanese	Manhattan – Midtown West	1 Michelin star	1 Michelin star	Closed		
Sushi Ichimura	Japanese	Manhattan – Tribeca	—	—	1 Michelin star	1 Michelin star	Closed
Sushi Nakazawa	Japanese	Manhattan – West Village	1 Michelin star	1 Michelin star	1 Michelin star	1 Michelin star	1 Michelin star
Sushi Noz	Japanese	Manhattan – Upper East Side	1 Michelin star	1 Michelin star	2 Michelin stars	2 Michelin stars	2 Michelin stars
Sushi Sho	Japanese	Manhattan – Midtown East	—	—	—	2 Michelin stars	3 Michelin stars
Sushi Yasuda	Japanese	Manhattan – Midtown East	1 Michelin star	1 Michelin star	1 Michelin star	—	—
Tempura Matsui	Japanese	Manhattan – Midtown East	1 Michelin star	1 Michelin star	1 Michelin star	1 Michelin star	1 Michelin star
The Clocktower	British	Manhattan – Flatiron District	1 Michelin star	—	—	—	—
The Four Horsemen	American	Brooklyn – Williamsburg	1 Michelin star	1 Michelin star	1 Michelin star	1 Michelin star	1 Michelin star
The Modern	Contemporary	Manhattan – Midtown West	2 Michelin stars	2 Michelin stars	2 Michelin stars	2 Michelin stars	2 Michelin stars
The Musket Room	Contemporary	Manhattan – Nolita	1 Michelin star	1 Michelin star	1 Michelin star	1 Michelin star	—
The River Café	Contemporary	Brooklyn – DUMBO	1 Michelin star	1 Michelin star	—	—	—
Torien	Japanese	Manhattan – East Village	—	1 Michelin star	1 Michelin star	1 Michelin star	1 Michelin star
Torrisi	Italian	Manhattan – Little Italy	—	—	1 Michelin star	1 Michelin star	1 Michelin star
Tsukimi	Japanese	Manhattan – East Village	1 Michelin star	1 Michelin star	1 Michelin star	1 Michelin star	1 Michelin star
Tuome	Fusion	Manhattan – East Village	1 Michelin star	1 Michelin star	1 Michelin star	1 Michelin star	1 Michelin star
Vestry	Contemporary	Manhattan – SoHo	1 Michelin star	1 Michelin star	1 Michelin star	—	Closed
Wallsé	Austrian	Manhattan – West Village	1 Michelin star	—	—	—	—
Yamada	Japanese	Manhattan – Chinatown	—	—	—	—	1 Michelin star
Yingtao	Chinese	Manhattan – Hell's Kitchen	—	—	—	1 Michelin star	1 Michelin star
Yoshino	Japanese	Manhattan – East Village	—	1 Michelin star	1 Michelin star	1 Michelin star	1 Michelin star
ZZ's Clam Bar	Seafood	Manhattan – Greenwich Village	1 Michelin star	—	Closed		
Reference							

== 2011–2020 lists ==
Key
1 Michelin star	One Michelin star
2 Michelin stars	Two Michelin stars
3 Michelin stars	Three Michelin stars
—	The restaurant did not receive a star that year
Closed	The restaurant is no longer open

Michelin-starred restaurants
Name	Cuisine	Location	2011	2012	2013	2014	2015	2016	2017	2018	2019	2020
15 East	French-inspired Japanese	Manhattan – Union Square	—	—	1 Michelin star	1 Michelin star	1 Michelin star	—	—	—	—	—
A Voce Columbus	Italian	Manhattan – Columbus Circle	1 Michelin star	1 Michelin star	1 Michelin star	1 Michelin star	—	—	Closed			
A Voce Madison	Italian	Manhattan – Flatiron District	1 Michelin star	1 Michelin star	1 Michelin star	1 Michelin star	—	—	—	Closed		
Adour	French	Manhattan – Midtown East	1 Michelin star	1 Michelin star	1 Michelin star	Closed						
Agern	Scandinavian	Manhattan – Midtown East	—	—	—	—	—	—	1 Michelin star	1 Michelin star	1 Michelin star	Closed
Ai Fiori	French, Italian	Manhattan – Midtown South	—	1 Michelin star	1 Michelin star	1 Michelin star	1 Michelin star	1 Michelin star	1 Michelin star	1 Michelin star	1 Michelin star	1 Michelin star
Aldea	Portuguese	Manhattan – Flatiron District	1 Michelin star	1 Michelin star	1 Michelin star	1 Michelin star	1 Michelin star	1 Michelin star	1 Michelin star	1 Michelin star	1 Michelin star	Closed
Alto	Italian	Manhattan – Midtown East	2 Michelin stars	Closed								
Andanada	Spanish	Manhattan – Lincoln Square	—	—	—	—	1 Michelin star	1 Michelin star	1 Michelin star	Closed		
Annisa	Asian cuisine French	Manhattan – West Village	1 Michelin star	1 Michelin star	1 Michelin star	1 Michelin star	—	—	—	Closed		
Anthos	Greek	Manhattan – Midtown West	1 Michelin star	Closed								
L'Appart	French	Manhattan – Financial District	—	—	—	—	—	—	1 Michelin star	1 Michelin star	1 Michelin star	1 Michelin star
Aquavit	Scandinavian	Manhattan – Midtown East	—	—	1 Michelin star	1 Michelin star	2 Michelin stars	2 Michelin stars	2 Michelin stars	2 Michelin stars	2 Michelin stars	2 Michelin stars
Aska	Scandinavian	Brooklyn – Williamsburg	—	—	—	1 Michelin star	—	—	2 Michelin stars	2 Michelin stars	2 Michelin stars	2 Michelin stars
L'Atelier de Joël Robuchon	French	Manhattan – Chelsea	1 Michelin star	2 Michelin stars	Closed						2 Michelin stars	2 Michelin stars
Atera	Contemporary	Manhattan – Tribeca	—	—	2 Michelin stars	2 Michelin stars	2 Michelin stars	2 Michelin stars	2 Michelin stars	2 Michelin stars	2 Michelin stars	2 Michelin stars
Atomix	Korean	Manhattan – Flatiron District	—	—	—	—	—	—	—	—	1 Michelin star	2 Michelin stars
Aureole	American, New American	Manhattan – Midtown West	1 Michelin star	1 Michelin star	1 Michelin star	1 Michelin star	1 Michelin star	1 Michelin star	1 Michelin star	1 Michelin star	—	Closed
Babbo	Italian	Manhattan – Greenwich Village	—	—	—	1 Michelin star	1 Michelin star	1 Michelin star	1 Michelin star	1 Michelin star	1 Michelin star	—
Bar Uchū	Japanese	Manhattan – Lower East Side	—	—	—	—	—	—	—	1 Michelin star	1 Michelin star	1 Michelin star
Bâtard	French	Manhattan – Tribeca	—	—	—	—	1 Michelin star	1 Michelin star	1 Michelin star	1 Michelin star	1 Michelin star	1 Michelin star
Benno	Mediterranean	Manhattan – NoMad	—	—	—	—	—	—	—	—	—	1 Michelin star
Le Bernardin	Seafood	Manhattan – Midtown West	3 Michelin stars	3 Michelin stars	3 Michelin stars	3 Michelin stars	3 Michelin stars	3 Michelin stars	3 Michelin stars	3 Michelin stars	3 Michelin stars	3 Michelin stars
Betony	New American	Manhattan – Midtown West	—	—	—	—	1 Michelin star	1 Michelin star	1 Michelin star	Closed		
Blanca	Contemporary	Brooklyn – Bushwick	—	—	1 Michelin star	1 Michelin star	2 Michelin stars	2 Michelin stars	2 Michelin stars	2 Michelin stars	2 Michelin stars	2 Michelin stars
BLT Fish	Seafood	Manhattan – Chelsea	1 Michelin star	—	—	—	Closed					
Blue Hill	American	Manhattan – Greenwich Village	1 Michelin star	1 Michelin star	1 Michelin star	1 Michelin star	1 Michelin star	1 Michelin star	1 Michelin star	1 Michelin star	1 Michelin star	1 Michelin star
Blue Hill at Stone Barns	American	Westchester – Tarrytown	—	—	—	—	—	—	—	—	—	2 Michelin stars
Bouley	French	Manhattan – Tribeca	1 Michelin star	1 Michelin star	1 Michelin star	1 Michelin star	1 Michelin star	1 Michelin star	—	—	Closed	
Bouley at Home	Contemporary	Manhattan – Flatiron District	—	—	—	—	—	—	—	—	1 Michelin star	1 Michelin star
The Breslin	Gastropub	Manhattan – NoMad	1 Michelin star	1 Michelin star	1 Michelin star	1 Michelin star	1 Michelin star	1 Michelin star	1 Michelin star	1 Michelin star	—	—
Brushstroke	Japanese	Manhattan – Tribeca	—	1 Michelin star	1 Michelin star	1 Michelin star	1 Michelin star	1 Michelin star	—	—	Closed	
Café Boulud	French	Manhattan – Upper East Side	1 Michelin star	1 Michelin star	1 Michelin star	1 Michelin star	1 Michelin star	1 Michelin star	1 Michelin star	1 Michelin star	1 Michelin star	—
Café China	Chinese	Manhattan – Midtown East	—	—	1 Michelin star	1 Michelin star	1 Michelin star	1 Michelin star	1 Michelin star	1 Michelin star	1 Michelin star	—
Cagen	Japanese	Manhattan – East Village	—	—	—	—	—	1 Michelin star	1 Michelin star	—	—	—
Carbone	Italian	Manhattan – Greenwich Village	—	—	—	1 Michelin star	1 Michelin star	1 Michelin star	1 Michelin star	1 Michelin star	1 Michelin star	1 Michelin star
Casa Enrique	Mexican	Queens – Long Island City	—	—	—	—	1 Michelin star	1 Michelin star	1 Michelin star	1 Michelin star	1 Michelin star	1 Michelin star
Casa Mono	Spanish	Manhattan – Gramercy Park	1 Michelin star	1 Michelin star	1 Michelin star	1 Michelin star	1 Michelin star	1 Michelin star	1 Michelin star	1 Michelin star	1 Michelin star	1 Michelin star
Caviar Russe	Contemporary	Manhattan – Midtown East	—	—	—	1 Michelin star	1 Michelin star	1 Michelin star	1 Michelin star	1 Michelin star	1 Michelin star	1 Michelin star
Chef's Table at Brooklyn Fare	Contemporary Seafood	Manhattan – Hell's Kitchen (Note: Chef's Table at Brooklyn Fare moved from Brooklyn to Manhattan in 2016)	2 Michelin stars	3 Michelin stars	3 Michelin stars	3 Michelin stars	3 Michelin stars	3 Michelin stars	3 Michelin stars	3 Michelin stars	3 Michelin stars	3 Michelin stars
Claro	Mexican	Brooklyn – Boerum Hill	—	—	—	—	—	—	—	—	1 Michelin star	1 Michelin star
The Clocktower	American	Manhattan – Flatiron District	—	—	—	—	—	—	—	1 Michelin star	1 Michelin star	1 Michelin star
Contra	New American	Manhattan – Lower East Side	—	—	—	—	—	—	1 Michelin star	1 Michelin star	1 Michelin star	1 Michelin star
Convivio	Italian	Manhattan – Turtle Bay	1 Michelin star	Closed								
Corton	French	Manhattan – Tribeca	2 Michelin stars	2 Michelin stars	2 Michelin stars	Closed						
Cote	Korean	Manhattan – Flatiron District	—	—	—	—	—	—	—	1 Michelin star	1 Michelin star	1 Michelin star
Le Coucou	French	Manhattan – Tribeca	—	—	—	—	—	—	—	—	1 Michelin star	1 Michelin star
Crown Shy	Contemporary	Manhattan – Financial District	—	—	—	—	—	—	—	—	—	1 Michelin star
Daniel	French	Manhattan – Upper East Side	3 Michelin stars	3 Michelin stars	3 Michelin stars	3 Michelin stars	2 Michelin stars	2 Michelin stars	2 Michelin stars	2 Michelin stars	2 Michelin stars	2 Michelin stars
Danji	Korean	Manhattan – Midtown West	—	1 Michelin star	1 Michelin star	1 Michelin star	—	—	—	—	—	—
Danny Brown Wine Bar & Kitchen	European	Queens – Forest Hills	1 Michelin star	1 Michelin star	1 Michelin star	1 Michelin star	1 Michelin star	Closed				
Del Posto	Italian	Manhattan – Chelsea	—	1 Michelin star	1 Michelin star	1 Michelin star	1 Michelin star	1 Michelin star	1 Michelin star	1 Michelin star	1 Michelin star	1 Michelin star
Delaware & Hudson	American	Brooklyn – Williamsburg	—	—	—	—	1 Michelin star	1 Michelin star	1 Michelin star	1 Michelin star	Closed	
Dovetail	American	Manhattan – Upper West Side	1 Michelin star	1 Michelin star	1 Michelin star	1 Michelin star	1 Michelin star	1 Michelin star	1 Michelin star	1 Michelin star	Closed	
Dressler	American	Brooklyn – Williamsburg	1 Michelin star	1 Michelin star	1 Michelin star	Closed						
Eleven Madison Park	Contemporary (Note: The menu changed to Vegan upon reopening after the COVID-19 pandemic in 2021)	Manhattan – Midtown South	1 Michelin star	3 Michelin stars	3 Michelin stars	3 Michelin stars	3 Michelin stars	3 Michelin stars	3 Michelin stars	3 Michelin stars	3 Michelin stars	3 Michelin stars
Estela	Contemporary	Manhattan – Nolita	—	—	—	—	—	—	—	—	—	1 Michelin star
Faro	American,Italian	Brooklyn – Bushwick	—	—	—	—	—	—	1 Michelin star	1 Michelin star	1 Michelin star	—
The Finch	New American	Brooklyn – Clinton Hill	—	—	—	—	—	1 Michelin star	1 Michelin star	1 Michelin star	1 Michelin star	1 Michelin star
The Four Horsemen	New American	Brooklyn – Williamsburg	—	—	—	—	—	—	—	—	—	1 Michelin star
Gabriel Kreuther	Contemporary	Manhattan – Midtown West	—	—	—	—	—	1 Michelin star	1 Michelin star	1 Michelin star	2 Michelin stars	2 Michelin stars
Gilt	New American	Manhattan – Midtown East	2 Michelin stars	2 Michelin stars	2 Michelin stars	Closed						
Gordon Ramsay at The London	French	Manhattan – Midtown West	2 Michelin stars	2 Michelin stars	2 Michelin stars	—	Closed					
Gotham Bar and Grill	New American	Manhattan – Greenwich Village	1 Michelin star	1 Michelin star	1 Michelin star	1 Michelin star	1 Michelin star	1 Michelin star	1 Michelin star	1 Michelin star	1 Michelin star	1 Michelin star
Gramercy Tavern	Contemporary	Manhattan – Flatiron District	1 Michelin star	1 Michelin star	1 Michelin star	1 Michelin star	1 Michelin star	1 Michelin star	1 Michelin star	1 Michelin star	1 Michelin star	1 Michelin star
Le Grill de Joël Robuchon	French	Manhattan – Chelsea	—	—	—	—	—	—	—	—	1 Michelin star	—
Günter Seeger	New American	Manhattan – Meatpacking District	—	—	—	—	—	—	1 Michelin star	1 Michelin star	1 Michelin star	—
Hakkasan	Cantonese	Manhattan – Midtown West	—	—	1 Michelin star	1 Michelin star	1 Michelin star	—	—	—	—	—
Heartbreak	German	Manhattan – Bowery	—	1 Michelin star	Closed							
Hirohisa	Japanese	Manhattan – SoHo	—	—	—	—	—	1 Michelin star	1 Michelin star	1 Michelin star	1 Michelin star	1 Michelin star
Ichimura at Brushstroke	Japanese	Manhattan – Tribeca	—	—	—	1 Michelin star	2 Michelin stars	2 Michelin stars	—	—	Closed	
Ichimura at Uchū	Japanese	Manhattan – Lower East Side	—	—	—	—	—	—	—	—	2 Michelin stars	2 Michelin stars
Le Jardinier	French	Manhattan – Midtown East	—	—	—	—	—	—	—	—	—	1 Michelin star
Jean-Georges	Contemporary	Manhattan – Columbus Circle	3 Michelin stars	3 Michelin stars	3 Michelin stars	3 Michelin stars	3 Michelin stars	3 Michelin stars	3 Michelin stars	2 Michelin stars	2 Michelin stars	2 Michelin stars
Jeju Noodle Bar	Korean	Manhattan – West Village	—	—	—	—	—	—	—	—	1 Michelin star	1 Michelin star
Jewel Bako	Japanese	Manhattan – East Village	1 Michelin star	1 Michelin star	1 Michelin star	1 Michelin star	1 Michelin star	1 Michelin star	1 Michelin star	1 Michelin star	1 Michelin star	1 Michelin star
Jungsik	Korean	Manhattan – Tribeca	—	—	1 Michelin star	2 Michelin stars	2 Michelin stars	2 Michelin stars	2 Michelin stars	2 Michelin stars	2 Michelin stars	2 Michelin stars
Juni	American	Manhattan – Midtown South	—	—	—	—	1 Michelin star	1 Michelin star	Closed			
Junoon	Indian	Manhattan – NoMad	—	1 Michelin star	1 Michelin star	1 Michelin star	1 Michelin star	1 Michelin star	1 Michelin star	1 Michelin star	1 Michelin star	—
Kajitsu	Japanese	Manhattan – Murray Hill	2 Michelin stars	2 Michelin stars	1 Michelin star	1 Michelin star	1 Michelin star	1 Michelin star	1 Michelin star	1 Michelin star	1 Michelin star	1 Michelin star
Kanoyama	Japanese	Manhattan – East Village	—	—	—	—	—	—	1 Michelin star	1 Michelin star	1 Michelin star	1 Michelin star
Kosaka	Japanese	Manhattan – Chelsea	—	—	—	—	—	—	—	—	1 Michelin star	1 Michelin star
Kyo Ya	Japanese	Manhattan – Upper East Side	1 Michelin star	1 Michelin star	1 Michelin star	1 Michelin star	1 Michelin star	1 Michelin star	1 Michelin star	1 Michelin star	1 Michelin star	Closed
Lan Sheng	Chinese	Manhattan – Midtown South	—	—	1 Michelin star	1 Michelin star	—	—	—	—	—	—
Laut	Malaysian, Thai	Manhattan – Flatiron District	1 Michelin star	1 Michelin star	—	—	—	—	—	—	—	—
Lincoln Ristorante	Italian	Manhattan – Lincoln Square	—	—	—	1 Michelin star	1 Michelin star	—	—	—	—	—
Luksus at Torst	Nordic	Brooklyn – Greenpoint	—	—	—	—	1 Michelin star	1 Michelin star	1 Michelin star	Closed		
M. Wells Steakhouse	Steakhouse	Queens – Long Island City	—	—	—	—	1 Michelin star	1 Michelin star	—	—	—	—
Marc Forgione	American	Manhattan – Tribeca	1 Michelin star	1 Michelin star	—	—	—	—	—	—	—	—
Marea	Italian, Seafood	Manhattan – Midtown West	2 Michelin stars	2 Michelin stars	2 Michelin stars	2 Michelin stars	2 Michelin stars	2 Michelin stars	2 Michelin stars	2 Michelin stars	2 Michelin stars	1 Michelin star
Masa	Japanese	Manhattan – Columbus Circle	3 Michelin stars	3 Michelin stars	3 Michelin stars	3 Michelin stars	3 Michelin stars	3 Michelin stars	3 Michelin stars	3 Michelin stars	3 Michelin stars	3 Michelin stars
Meadowsweet	Mediterranean	Brooklyn – Williamsburg	—	—	—	—	1 Michelin star	1 Michelin star	1 Michelin star	1 Michelin star	1 Michelin star	1 Michelin star
Minetta Tavern	Steakhouse, American	Manhattan – Greenwich Village	1 Michelin star	1 Michelin star	1 Michelin star	1 Michelin star	1 Michelin star	1 Michelin star	1 Michelin star	1 Michelin star	—	—
The Modern	Contemporary	Manhattan – Midtown West	1 Michelin star	1 Michelin star	1 Michelin star	1 Michelin star	1 Michelin star	2 Michelin stars	2 Michelin stars	2 Michelin stars	2 Michelin stars	2 Michelin stars
Momofuku Ko	Asian	Manhattan – East Village	2 Michelin stars	2 Michelin stars	2 Michelin stars	2 Michelin stars	2 Michelin stars	2 Michelin stars	2 Michelin stars	2 Michelin stars	2 Michelin stars	2 Michelin stars
The Musket Room	Contemporary	Manhattan – Nolita	—	—	—	1 Michelin star	1 Michelin star	1 Michelin star	1 Michelin star	1 Michelin star	1 Michelin star	1 Michelin star
Nix	American,Vegetarian	Manhattan – Greenwich Village	—	—	—	—	—	—	1 Michelin star	1 Michelin star	1 Michelin star	1 Michelin star
Nobu	Japanese	Manhattan – Tribeca	1 Michelin star	—	—	—	—	—	—	—	—	—
Noda	Japanese	Manhattan – Flatiron District	—	—	—	—	—	—	—	—	1 Michelin star	1 Michelin star
The NoMad	Contemporary	Manhattan – NoMad	—	—	1 Michelin star	1 Michelin star	1 Michelin star	1 Michelin star	1 Michelin star	1 Michelin star	1 Michelin star	1 Michelin star
Oceana	Seafood	Manhattan – Midtown West	1 Michelin star	1 Michelin star	1 Michelin star	1 Michelin star	—	—	—	—	—	—
Odo	Japanese	Manhattan – Flatiron District	—	—	—	—	—	—	—	—	—	1 Michelin star
Okuda	Japanese	Manhattan – Chelsea	—	—	—	—	—	—	—	—	1 Michelin star	1 Michelin star
Oxalis	New American	Brooklyn – Prospect Heights	—	—	—	—	—	—	—	—	—	1 Michelin star
Oxomoco	Mexican	Brooklyn – Williamsburg	—	—	—	—	—	—	—	—	1 Michelin star	1 Michelin star
Per Se	Contemporary	Manhattan – Columbus Circle	3 Michelin stars	3 Michelin stars	3 Michelin stars	3 Michelin stars	3 Michelin stars	3 Michelin stars	3 Michelin stars	3 Michelin stars	3 Michelin stars	3 Michelin stars
Peter Luger Steak House	Steakhouse	Brooklyn – Williamsburg	1 Michelin star	1 Michelin star	1 Michelin star	1 Michelin star	1 Michelin star	1 Michelin star	1 Michelin star	1 Michelin star	1 Michelin star	1 Michelin star
Picholine	French	Manhattan – Lincoln Square	2 Michelin stars	1 Michelin star	1 Michelin star	—	1 Michelin star	Closed				
Piora	New American	Manhattan – West Village	—	—	—	—	1 Michelin star	1 Michelin star	1 Michelin star	Closed		
Pok Pok NY	Thai	Brooklyn – Columbia Street Waterfront District	—	—	—	—	1 Michelin star	1 Michelin star	—	—	Closed	
Public	Gastropub	Manhattan – Nolita	1 Michelin star	1 Michelin star	1 Michelin star	1 Michelin star	1 Michelin star	1 Michelin star	1 Michelin star	Closed		
Rebelle	French	Manhattan – Nolita	—	—	—	—	—	1 Michelin star	1 Michelin star	1 Michelin star	Closed	
Le Restaurant	Contemporary	Manhattan – Tribeca	—	—	—	1 Michelin star	Closed					
The River Café	Contemporary	Brooklyn – DUMBO	1 Michelin star	1 Michelin star	1 Michelin star	—	1 Michelin star	1 Michelin star	1 Michelin star	1 Michelin star	1 Michelin star	1 Michelin star
Rosanjin	Japanese	Manhattan – Tribeca	—	1 Michelin star	1 Michelin star	1 Michelin star	1 Michelin star	1 Michelin star	Closed			
Rouge Tomate	New American	Manhattan – Chelsea	1 Michelin star	1 Michelin star	1 Michelin star	1 Michelin star	—	—	—	1 Michelin star	Closed	
Satsuki	Japanese	Manhattan – Midtown West	—	—	—	—	—	—	—	1 Michelin star	1 Michelin star	1 Michelin star
Saul	Contemporary	Brooklyn – Prospect Heights	1 Michelin star	1 Michelin star	1 Michelin star	—	—	—	Closed			
Scalini Fedeli	French-influenced Italian	Manhattan – Tribeca	1 Michelin star	—	—	—	—	—	—	—	—	—
Seäsonal	Austrian, German	Manhattan – Midtown West	1 Michelin star	1 Michelin star	1 Michelin star	1 Michelin star	1 Michelin star	Closed				
Semilla	American	Brooklyn – Williamsburg	—	—	—	—	—	1 Michelin star	1 Michelin star	Closed		
Shalezeh	Persian	Manhattan – Upper East Side	1 Michelin star	—	—	Closed						
SHO Shaun Hergatt	Asian-inspired French	Manhattan – Financial District	1 Michelin star	2 Michelin stars	—	Closed						
La Sirena	Italian	Manhattan – Chelsea	—	—	—	—	—	—	1 Michelin star	1 Michelin star	Closed	
Somtum Der	Thai	Manhattan – East Village	—	—	—	—	—	1 Michelin star	—	—	—	—
Soto	Japanese	Manhattan – West Village	2 Michelin stars	2 Michelin stars	2 Michelin stars	2 Michelin stars	2 Michelin stars	2 Michelin stars	2 Michelin stars	Closed		
The Spotted Pig	Gastropub	Manhattan – West Village	1 Michelin star	1 Michelin star	1 Michelin star	1 Michelin star	1 Michelin star	1 Michelin star	—	—	—	Closed
Sushi Amane	Japanese	Manhattan – Turtle Bay	—	—	—	—	—	—	—	1 Michelin star	1 Michelin star	1 Michelin star
Sushi Azabu	Japanese	Manhattan – Tribeca	1 Michelin star	1 Michelin star	1 Michelin star	1 Michelin star	1 Michelin star	1 Michelin star	—	—	—	—
Sushi Ginza Onodera	Japanese	Manhattan – Midtown West	—	—	—	—	—	—	1 Michelin star	2 Michelin stars	2 Michelin stars	1 Michelin star
Sushi Inoue	Japanese	Manhattan – Harlem	—	—	—	—	—	—	1 Michelin star	1 Michelin star	1 Michelin star	1 Michelin star
Sushi Nakazawa	Japanese	Manhattan – West Village	—	—	—	—	—	—	—	—	1 Michelin star	1 Michelin star
Sushi Noz	Japanese	Manhattan – Upper East Side	—	—	—	—	—	—	—	—	1 Michelin star	1 Michelin star
Sushi of Gari	Japanese	Manhattan – Upper East Side	1 Michelin star	1 Michelin star	1 Michelin star	1 Michelin star	1 Michelin star	1 Michelin star	1 Michelin star	—	—	—
Sushi Yasuda	Japanese	Manhattan – Midtown East	—	—	—	—	—	1 Michelin star	1 Michelin star	1 Michelin star	1 Michelin star	1 Michelin star
Sushi Zo	Japanese	Manhattan – Greenwich Village	—	—	—	—	—	—	1 Michelin star	1 Michelin star	—	—
Take Root	New American	Brooklyn – Carroll Gardens	—	—	—	—	1 Michelin star	1 Michelin star	1 Michelin star	Closed		
Tamarind Tribeca	Indian	Manhattan – Tribeca	—	1 Michelin star	1 Michelin star	1 Michelin star	—	—	—	—	—	—
Telepan	American	Manhattan – Upper West Side	—	—	—	1 Michelin star	1 Michelin star	1 Michelin star	Closed			
Tempura Matsui	Japanese	Manhattan – Midtown East	—	—	—	—	—	1 Michelin star	1 Michelin star	1 Michelin star	1 Michelin star	1 Michelin star
Tetsu Basement	Japanese	Manhattan – Tribeca	—	—	—	—	—	—	—	—	2 Michelin stars	Closed
Torishin	Japanese	Manhattan – Hell's Kitchen	—	1 Michelin star	1 Michelin star	1 Michelin star	1 Michelin star	1 Michelin star	1 Michelin star	1 Michelin star	—	—
Torrisi Italian Specialities	Italian	Manhattan – Little Italy	—	—	1 Michelin star	1 Michelin star	1 Michelin star	Closed				
Tulsi	Indian	Manhattan – Turtle Bay	—	1 Michelin star	1 Michelin star	1 Michelin star	1 Michelin star	1 Michelin star	1 Michelin star	Closed		
Tuome	New American	Manhattan – East Village	—	—	—	—	—	—	—	—	1 Michelin star	1 Michelin star
Ukiyo	Japanese	Manhattan – East Village	—	—	—	—	—	—	—	—	—	1 Michelin star
Uncle Boons	Thai	Manhattan – Nolita	—	—	—	—	—	1 Michelin star	1 Michelin star	1 Michelin star	1 Michelin star	1 Michelin star
Ushiwakamaru	Japanese	Manhattan – Chelsea	—	—	—	—	—	—	1 Michelin star	1 Michelin star	—	—
La Vara	Spanish	Brooklyn – Cobble Hill	—	—	—	—	1 Michelin star	1 Michelin star	1 Michelin star	1 Michelin star	—	—
Veritas	New American	Manhattan – Flatiron District	1 Michelin star	1 Michelin star	—	Closed						
Wallsé	Austrian	Manhattan – West Village	1 Michelin star	1 Michelin star	1 Michelin star	1 Michelin star	1 Michelin star	1 Michelin star	1 Michelin star	1 Michelin star	1 Michelin star	1 Michelin star
wd~50	Molecular gastronomy New American	Manhattan – Lower East Side	1 Michelin star	1 Michelin star	1 Michelin star	1 Michelin star	Closed					
Zabb Elee	Thai	Queens – Jackson Heights	—	—	—	—	1 Michelin star	—	Closed			
ZZ's Clam Bar	Seafood	Manhattan – Greenwich Village	—	—	—	—	1 Michelin star	1 Michelin star	1 Michelin star	1 Michelin star	1 Michelin star	1 Michelin star
Reference												

== 2006–2010 lists ==
Key
1 Michelin star	One Michelin star
2 Michelin stars	Two Michelin stars
3 Michelin stars	Three Michelin stars
—	The restaurant did not receive a star that year
Closed	The restaurant is no longer open

Michelin-starred restaurants
Name	Cuisine	Location	2006	2007	2008	2009	2010
A Voce Columbus	Italian	Manhattan – Columbus Circle	—	1 Michelin star	1 Michelin star	—	1 Michelin star
Adour	French	Manhattan – Midtown East	—	—	—	2 Michelin stars	1 Michelin star
Alain Ducasse at the Essex House	French	Manhattan – Midtown West	3 Michelin stars	Closed			
Allen & Delancey	Contemporary European	Manhattan – Lower East Side	—	—	—	1 Michelin star	—
Alto	Italian	Manhattan – Midtown East	—	—	—	1 Michelin star	2 Michelin stars
Annisa	Asian French	Manhattan – West Village	1 Michelin star	1 Michelin star	1 Michelin star	1 Michelin star	1 Michelin star
Anthos	Greek	Manhattan – Midtown West	—	—	1 Michelin star	1 Michelin star	1 Michelin star
L'Atelier de Joël Robuchon	French	Manhattan – Chelsea	—	—	1 Michelin star	1 Michelin star	1 Michelin star
Aureole	American, New American	Manhattan – Midtown West	1 Michelin star	1 Michelin star	1 Michelin star	1 Michelin star	1 Michelin star
Babbo	Italian	Manhattan – Greenwich Village	1 Michelin star	1 Michelin star	1 Michelin star	—	—
Le Bernardin	Seafood	Manhattan – Midtown West	3 Michelin stars	3 Michelin stars	3 Michelin stars	3 Michelin stars	3 Michelin stars
Blue Hill	American	Manhattan – Greenwich Village	—	—	1 Michelin star	1 Michelin star	1 Michelin star
Bouley	French	Manhattan – Tribeca	2 Michelin stars	2 Michelin stars	2 Michelin stars	—	1 Michelin star
Café Boulud	French	Manhattan – Upper East Side	1 Michelin star	1 Michelin star	1 Michelin star	1 Michelin star	1 Michelin star
Café Gray	European, French	Manhattan – Columbus Circle	1 Michelin star	1 Michelin star	1 Michelin star	Closed	
Casa Mono	Spanish	Manhattan – Gramercy Park	—	—	—	—	1 Michelin star
Convivio	Italian	Manhattan – Turtle Bay	—	—	—	—	1 Michelin star
Corton	French	Manhattan – Tribeca	—	—	—	—	2 Michelin stars
Country	Contemporary	Manhattan – NoMad	—	1 Michelin star	1 Michelin star	—	—
Craft	American	Manhattan – Flatiron District	1 Michelin star	1 Michelin star	—	—	—
Cru	Contemporary	Manhattan – Greenwich Village	1 Michelin star	1 Michelin star	1 Michelin star	1 Michelin star	—
Daniel	French	Manhattan – Upper East Side	2 Michelin stars	2 Michelin stars	2 Michelin stars	2 Michelin stars	3 Michelin stars
Danube	Austrian	Manhattan – Tribeca	2 Michelin stars	1 Michelin star	1 Michelin star	Closed	
Del Posto	Italian	Manhattan – Chelsea	—	2 Michelin stars	2 Michelin stars	2 Michelin stars	1 Michelin star
Devi	Indian	Manhattan – Flatiron District	—	1 Michelin star	1 Michelin star	—	—
Dressler	American	Brooklyn – Williamsburg	—	—	1 Michelin star	1 Michelin star	1 Michelin star
Eighty One	Modern American	Manhattan – Upper West Side	—	—	—	1 Michelin star	1 Michelin star
Eleven Madison Park	Contemporary	Manhattan – Midtown South	—	—	—	—	1 Michelin star
Etats-Unis	American	Manhattan – Upper East Side	1 Michelin star	1 Michelin star	1 Michelin star	1 Michelin star	1 Michelin star
Fiamma Osteria	Italian	Manhattan – SoHo	1 Michelin star	1 Michelin star	—	1 Michelin star	Closed
Fleur de Sel	Contemporary American	Manhattan – Flatiron District	1 Michelin star	1 Michelin star	1 Michelin star	1 Michelin star	Closed
Gilt	New American	Manhattan – Midtown East	—	—	1 Michelin star	2 Michelin stars	2 Michelin stars
Gordon Ramsay at The London	French	Manhattan – Midtown West	—	—	2 Michelin stars	2 Michelin stars	2 Michelin stars
Gotham Bar and Grill	New American	Manhattan – Greenwich Village	1 Michelin star	1 Michelin star	1 Michelin star	1 Michelin star	1 Michelin star
La Goulue	French	Manhattan – Upper East Side	1 Michelin star	1 Michelin star	—	Closed	
Gramercy Tavern	Contemporary	Manhattan – Flatiron District	1 Michelin star	1 Michelin star	1 Michelin star	1 Michelin star	1 Michelin star
Insieme	Italian	Manhattan – Theater District	—	—	—	1 Michelin star	1 Michelin star
Jean-Georges	Contemporary	Manhattan – Columbus Circle	3 Michelin stars	3 Michelin stars	3 Michelin stars	3 Michelin stars	3 Michelin stars
Jewel Bako	Japanese	Manhattan – East Village	1 Michelin star	1 Michelin star	1 Michelin star	1 Michelin star	1 Michelin star
JoJo	Contemporary	Manhattan – Upper East Side	1 Michelin star	—	1 Michelin star	1 Michelin star	—
Junoon	Indian	Manhattan – NoMad	—	—	—	—	—
Kajitsu	Japanese	Manhattan – Murray Hill	—	—	—	—	1 Michelin star
Kurumazushi	Japanese	Manhattan – Midtown East	—	1 Michelin star	1 Michelin star	—	—
Kyo Ya	Japanese	Manhattan – Upper East Side	—	—	—	1 Michelin star	1 Michelin star
Lever House	Milanese	Manhattan – Midtown East	1 Michelin star	1 Michelin star	—	—	Closed
Lo Scalco	Italian	Manhattan – Tribeca	1 Michelin star	Closed			
Marc Forgione	American	Manhattan – Tribeca	—	—	—	—	1 Michelin star
March	Contemporary	Manhattan – Midtown East	1 Michelin star	Closed			
Marea	Italian, Seafood	Manhattan – Midtown West	—	—	—	—	1 Michelin star
Masa	Japanese	Manhattan – Columbus Circle	2 Michelin stars	2 Michelin stars	2 Michelin stars	3 Michelin stars	3 Michelin stars
Minetta Tavern	Steakhouse, American	Manhattan – Greenwich Village	—	—	—	—	1 Michelin star
The Modern	Contemporary	Manhattan – Midtown West	1 Michelin star	1 Michelin star	1 Michelin star	1 Michelin star	1 Michelin star
Momofuku Ko	Asian	Manhattan – East Village	—	—	—	2 Michelin stars	2 Michelin stars
Nobu	Japanese	Manhattan – Tribeca	1 Michelin star	—	—	—	—
Oceana	Seafood	Manhattan – Midtown West	1 Michelin star	1 Michelin star	1 Michelin star	1 Michelin star	1 Michelin star
Per Se	Contemporary	Manhattan – Columbus Circle	3 Michelin stars	3 Michelin stars	3 Michelin stars	3 Michelin stars	3 Michelin stars
Perry Street	American	Manhattan – West Village	—	1 Michelin star	1 Michelin star	1 Michelin star	1 Michelin star
Peter Luger Steak House	Steakhouse	Brooklyn – Williamsburg	1 Michelin star	1 Michelin star	1 Michelin star	1 Michelin star	1 Michelin star
Picholine	French	Manhattan – Lincoln Square	1 Michelin star	1 Michelin star	2 Michelin stars	2 Michelin stars	2 Michelin stars
Public	Gastropub	Manhattan – Nolita	—	—	—	1 Michelin star	1 Michelin star
Rhong-Tiam	Thai	Manhattan – Greenwich Village	—	—	—	—	1 Michelin star
The River Café	Contemporary	Brooklyn – DUMBO	—	—	—	—	1 Michelin star
Rouge Tomate	New American	Manhattan – Chelsea	—	—	—	—	1 Michelin star
Saul	Contemporary	Brooklyn – Prospect Heights	1 Michelin star	1 Michelin star	1 Michelin star	1 Michelin star	1 Michelin star
Seäsonal	Austrian, German	Manhattan – Midtown West	—	—	—	—	1 Michelin star
Shalezeh	Persian	Manhattan – Upper East Side	—	—	—	—	1 Michelin star
SHO Shaun Hergatt	Asian-inspired French cuisine	Manhattan – Financial District	—	—	—	—	1 Michelin star
Soto	Japanese	Manhattan – West Village	—	—	—	—	1 Michelin star
The Spotted Pig	Gastropub	Manhattan – West Village	1 Michelin star	1 Michelin star	1 Michelin star	1 Michelin star	1 Michelin star
Sushi Azabu	Japanese	Manhattan – Tribeca	—	—	—	—	1 Michelin star
Sushi of Gari	Japanese	Manhattan – Upper East Side	—	1 Michelin star	1 Michelin star	1 Michelin star	1 Michelin star
Veritas	New American	Manhattan – Flatiron District	1 Michelin star	1 Michelin star	1 Michelin star	1 Michelin star	1 Michelin star
Vong	Southeast Asian	Manhattan – Midtown East	1 Michelin star	1 Michelin star	1 Michelin star	Closed	
Wallsé	Austrian	Manhattan – West Village	1 Michelin star	1 Michelin star	1 Michelin star	1 Michelin star	1 Michelin star
wd~50	Molecular gastronomy New American	Manhattan – Lower East Side	1 Michelin star	1 Michelin star	1 Michelin star	1 Michelin star	1 Michelin star
Reference							

== See also ==
- List of restaurants in New York City
- List of Michelin 3-star restaurants in the United States
- List of Michelin-starred restaurants in American Northeast Cities

== Bibliography ==
- Michelin Guide New York City 2006. Michelin Travel Publications. 2006. ISBN 978-2-06-711555-2.
- Michelin Guide New York City 2007. Michelin Travel Publications. 2007. ISBN 978-2-06-712200-0.
- Michelin Guide New York City 2008. Michelin Travel Publications. 2008. ISBN 978-2-06-712984-9.
- Michelin Guide New York City 2009. Michelin Travel Publications. 2009. ISBN 978-2-06-713706-6.
- Michelin Guide New York City 2010. Michelin Travel Publications. 2010. ISBN 978-2-06-714514-6.
- Michelin Guide New York City 2011. Michelin Travel Publications. 2011. ISBN 978-2-06-715334-9.
- Michelin Guide New York City 2012. Michelin Travel Publications. 2012. ISBN 978-2-06-716528-1.
- Michelin Guide New York City 2013. Michelin Travel Publications. 2013. ISBN 978-2-06-717687-4.
- Michelin Guide New York City 2014. Michelin Travel Publications. 2014. ISBN 978-2-06-718695-8.
- Michelin Guide New York City 2015. Michelin Travel Publications. 2015. ISBN 978-2-06-719410-6.
- Michelin Guide New York City 2016. Michelin Travel Publications. 2016. ISBN 978-2-06-720291-7.
- Michelin Guide New York City 2017. Michelin Travel Publications. 2017. ISBN 978-2-06-721236-7.
- Michelin Guide New York City 2018. Michelin Travel Publications. 2018. ISBN 978-2-06-722086-7.
- Michelin Guide New York City 2019. Michelin Travel Publications. 2019. ISBN 978-2-06-723051-4.
- Michelin Guide New York City 2020. Michelin Travel Publications. 2020. ISBN 978-2-06-723905-0.
