= Caviar Russe =

Restaurant in New York City, U.S.

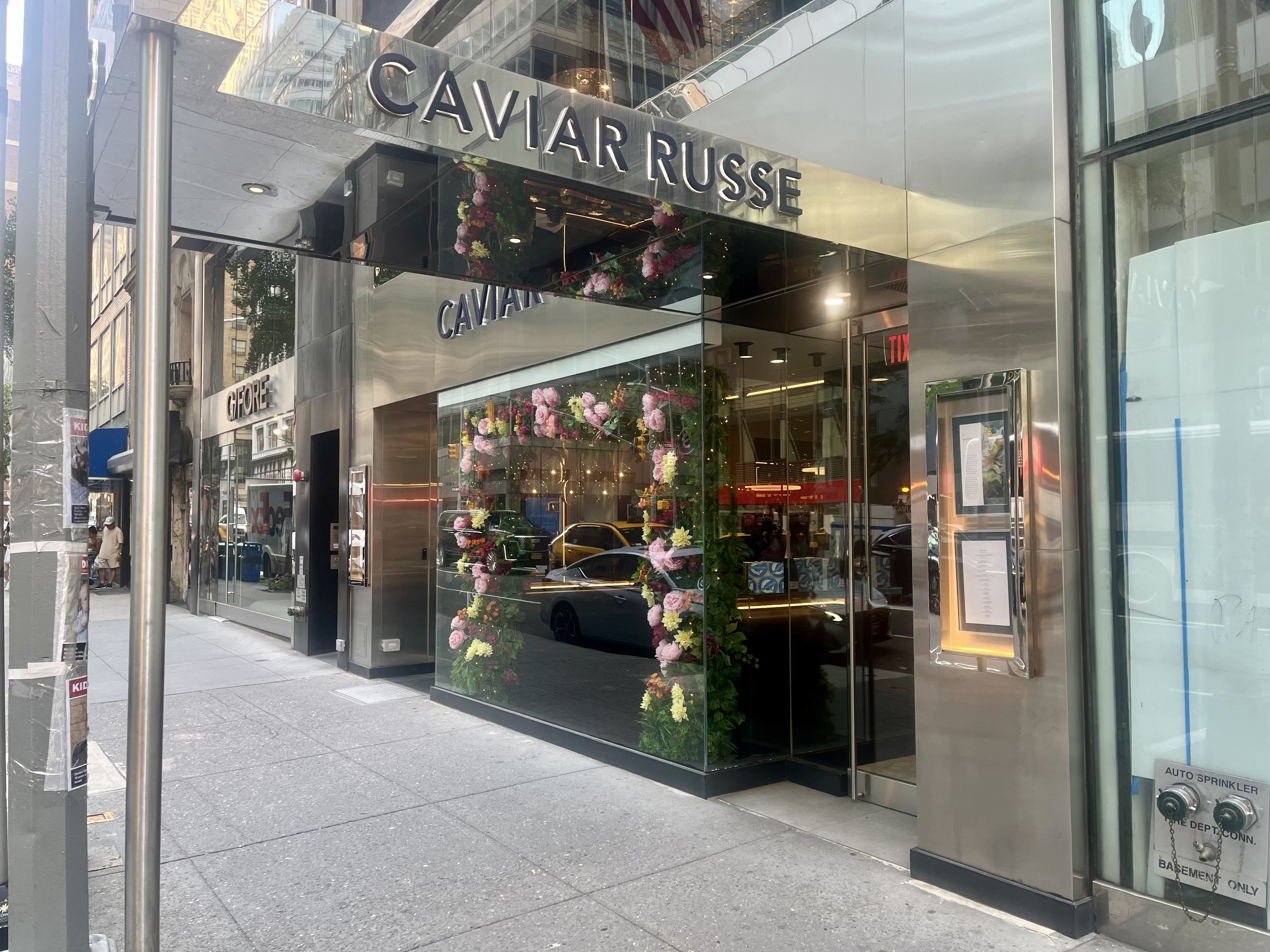
- The restaurant's exterior in 2024
- Interactive map of Caviar Russe

Restaurant information
- Established: June 1997
- Food type: New American, Seafood
- Location: 538 Madison Avenue, New York City, New York, 10022, United States
- Coordinates: 40°45′39″N 73°58′26″W
- Website: https://caviarrusse.com/pages/new-york-about

Caviar Russe is a restaurant in New York City. The restaurant serves seafood and has received a Michelin star maintaining said star since 2010. As per the name, they specialize in caviar selling it retail along with having a separate caviar tasting menu. The options range from the less expensive pacific sturgeon for $65 for 25 oz along with sterlet and ossetra to almas beluga, a rare golden caviar produced from albino sturgeons for $595 for 25 oz along with caviar tasting menus. Outside of their caviar menu, the restaurant otherwise has a Bar and Lounge menu along with a main Dining Room which has a la carte options along with a main tasting menu consisting of prix fixe options ranging from 3 to 6 courses. There is a second location in Miami which also sells their products.

== See also ==
- List of Michelin-starred restaurants in New York City
- List of seafood restaurants
