= Oxomoco (restaurant) =

Mexican restaurant in New York City

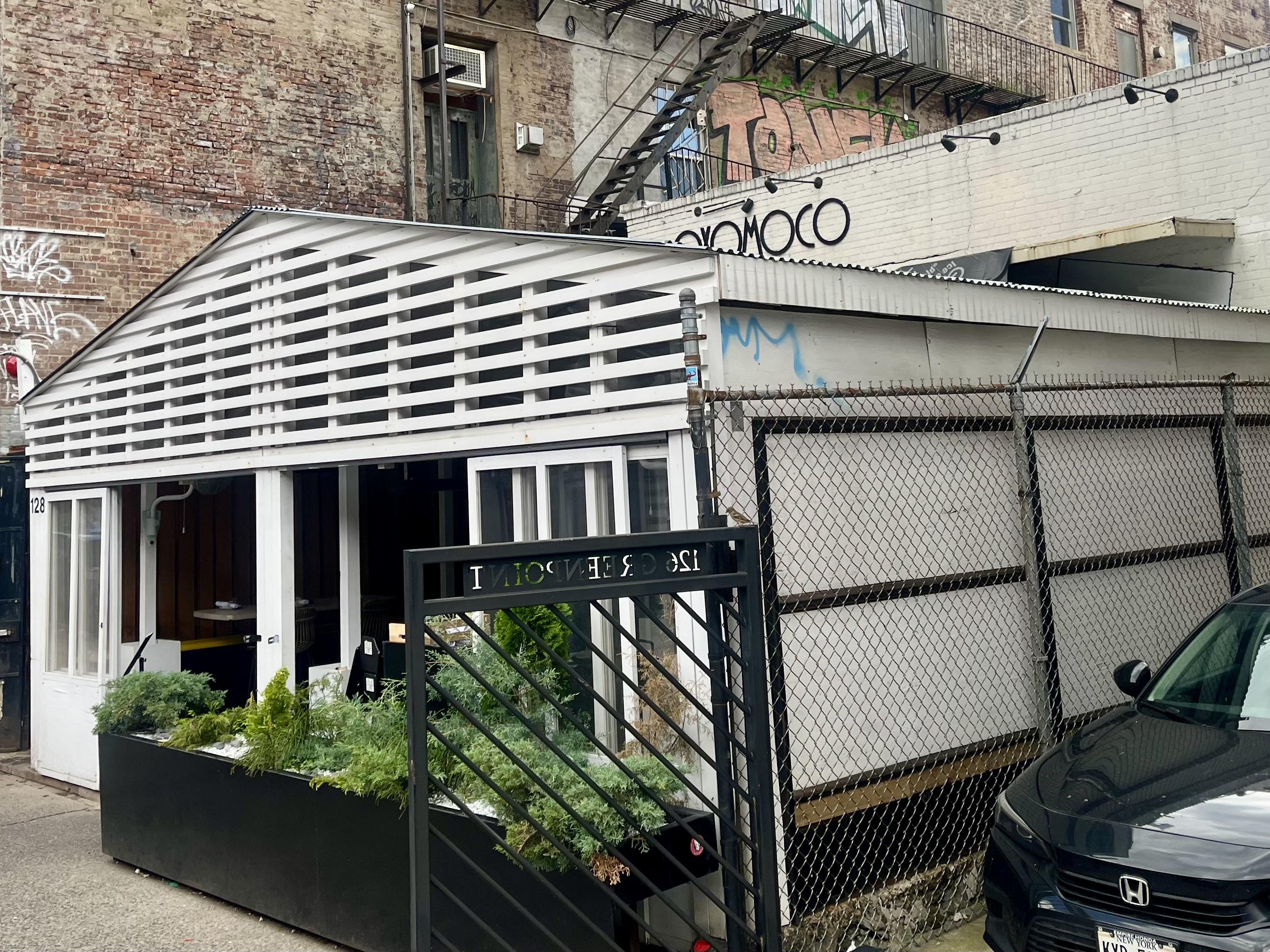
- The restaurant's exterior in 2024
- Interactive map of Oxomoco

Restaurant information
- Established: June 5, 2018
- Food type: Mexican
- Rating: 1 Michelin star
- Location: 128 Greenpoint Avenue, Brooklyn, New York, 11222, United States
- Coordinates: 40°43′47.8″N 73°57′19.8″W
- Website: oxomoconyc.com

Oxomoco is a Mexican restaurant in New York City. The restaurant has received a Michelin star. Eater New York has rated Oxomoco 3 out of 4 stars, and Time Out New York has rated the restaurant 4 out of 5 stars.

== See also ==
- List of Mexican restaurants
- List of Michelin-starred restaurants in New York City
