= Hirohisa (restaurant) =

Japanese restaurant in New York City

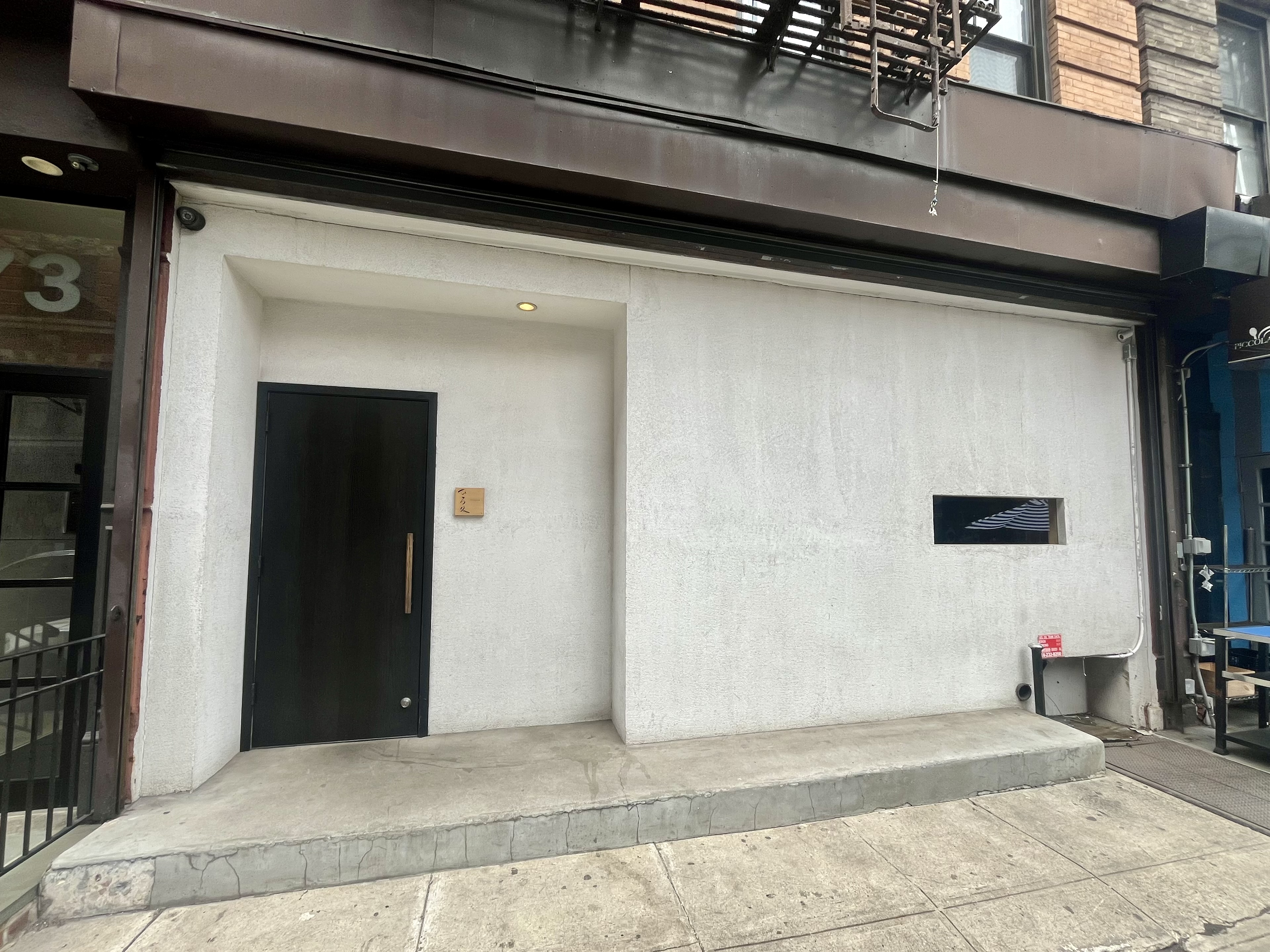
- Hirohisa in April 2024
- Interactive map of Hirohisa

Restaurant information
- Established: 2013
- Closed: 2026
- Food type: Japanese
- Location: 73 Thompson Street, New York City, New York, 10012
- Coordinates: 40°43′28.5″N 74°0′11″W

Hirohisa was a Japanese restaurant in New York City. The restaurant had received a Michelin star.

The restaurant closed in March 2026. The restaurant's website states they are planning to relocate and open in a new location in fall 2027.

== See also ==
- List of Japanese restaurants
- List of Michelin-starred restaurants in New York City
