= Kanoyama =

Japanese restaurant in New York City, U.S.

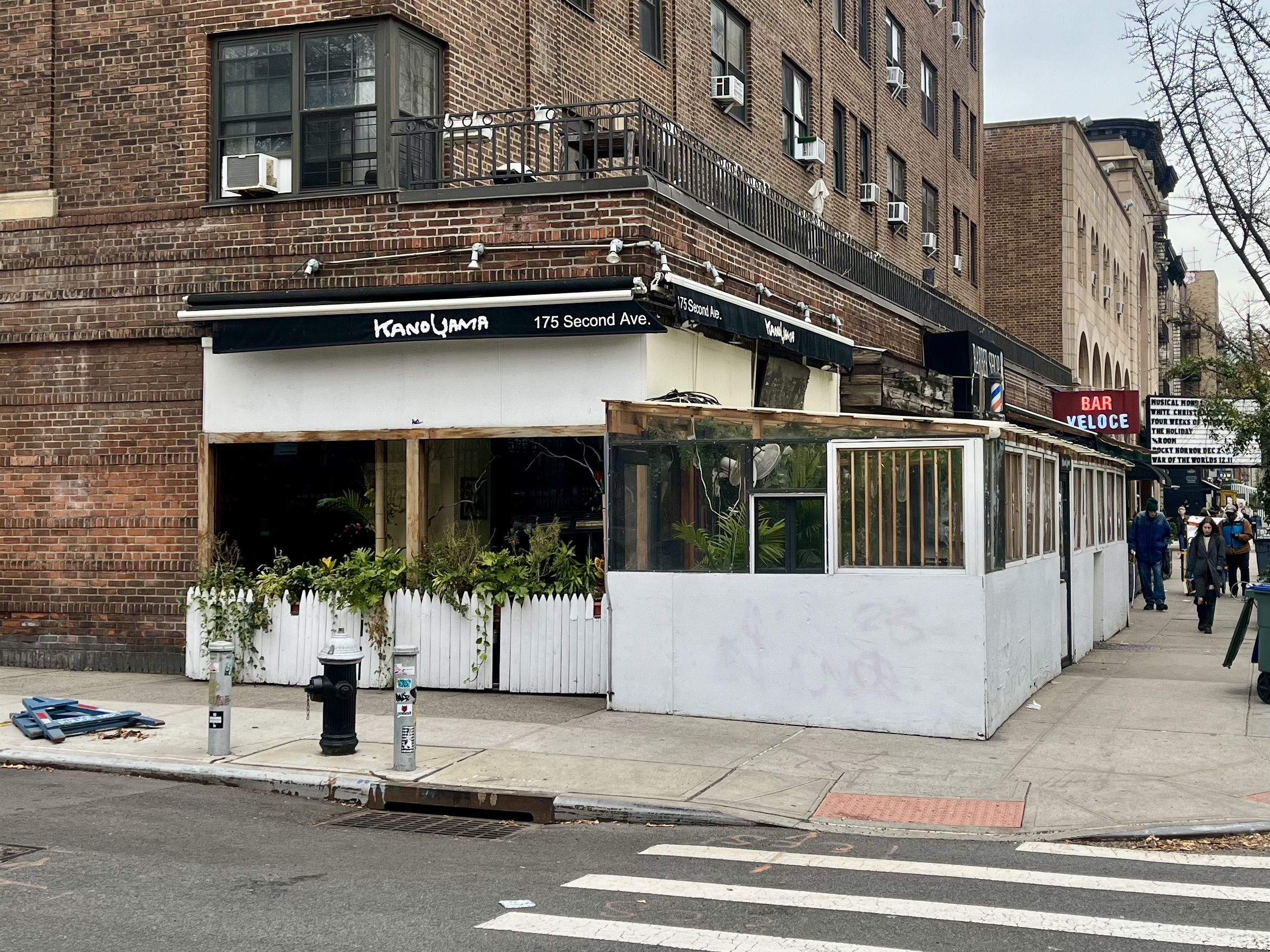
- Kanoyama in December 2023
- Interactive map of Kanoyama

Restaurant information
- Food type: Japanese
- Location: 175 Second Avenue, New York City, New York, 10003, United States
- Coordinates: 40°43′50″N 73°59′11.5″W

Kanoyama is a Japanese restaurant in New York City's East Village, in the U.S. state of New York. The restaurant serves sushi and had received a Michelin star, but lost it in 2023.

== See also ==
- List of Japanese restaurants
- List of Michelin-starred restaurants in New York City
