= Claro (restaurant) =

Mexican restaurant in New York City

- Interactive map of Claro

Restaurant information
- Established: 2017
- Head chef: TJ Steele
- Food type: Mexican
- Rating: (Michelin Guide)
- Location: 284 Third Avenue, Brooklyn, New York, 11215, United States
- Coordinates: 40°40′38.7″N 73°59′10.4″W
- Website: clarobk.com

Claro is a restaurant in Brooklyn, New York in Gowanus. The restaurant serves Mexican cuisine and received a Michelin star from 2019 to 2023.

== See also ==
- List of Mexican restaurants
- List of Michelin-starred restaurants in New York City
