= Jewel Bako =

Japanese restaurant in New York City, U.S.

- Interactive map of Jewel Bako

Restaurant information
- Closed: 2020
- Food type: Japanese
- Location: 239 East 5th Street, New York City, New York, 10003, United States
- Coordinates: 40°43′37.5″N 73°59′21.6″W

Jewel Bako was a Japanese restaurant in New York City. The restaurant served sushi and has received a Michelin star. The restaurant closed as a result of the COVID-19 pandemic.

== See also ==
- List of defunct restaurants of the United States
- List of Japanese restaurants
- List of Michelin-starred restaurants in New York City
