= Eighty One =

Defunct restaurant in New York City, U.S.

- Interactive map of Eighty One

Restaurant information
- Established: February 20, 2008
- Closed: April 4, 2010
- Location: 45 West 81st Street, New York City, New York, 10024, United States
- Coordinates: 40°46′59.3″N 73°58′26″W

Eighty One was a restaurant in New York City. The restaurant had received a Michelin star, before closing.

== See also ==
- List of Michelin-starred restaurants in New York City
