= Ukiyo (restaurant) =

Defunct restaurant in New York City, U.S.

- Interactive map of Ukiyo

Restaurant information
- Established: 2018
- Closed: 2020
- Location: 239 East 5th Street, New York City, New York, 10003, United States
- Coordinates: 40°43′37.4″N 73°59′21.5″W

Ukiyo was a restaurant in New York City. The restaurant had received a Michelin star.

== See also ==
- List of defunct restaurants of the United States
- List of Michelin-starred restaurants in New York City
