= Delaware & Hudson (restaurant) =

Defunct restaurant in New York City, U.S.

- Interactive map of Delaware & Hudson

Restaurant information
- Established: 2014
- Closed: 2018
- Location: 135 North 5th Street, Brooklyn, New York, 11249, United States
- Coordinates: 40°43′1.3″N 73°57′32.9″W

Delaware & Hudson was a restaurant in Brooklyn, New York City. The restaurant had received a Michelin star and was visited twice by Dave Chappelle, before closing in 2018.

== See also ==
- List of Michelin-starred restaurants in New York City
