= Dressler (restaurant) =

Defunct restaurant in New York City

- Interactive map of Dressler

Restaurant information
- Established: 2006
- Closed: 2013
- Location: 149 Broadway, Brooklyn, New York, 11211, United States
- Coordinates: 40°42′37.4″N 73°57′47.4″W

Dressler was a restaurant in New York City. The restaurant had received a Michelin star. Dalia Jurgensen was the chef, as of 2009.

== See also ==
- List of Michelin-starred restaurants in New York City
