= L'Appart =

Restaurant in New York City, U.S.

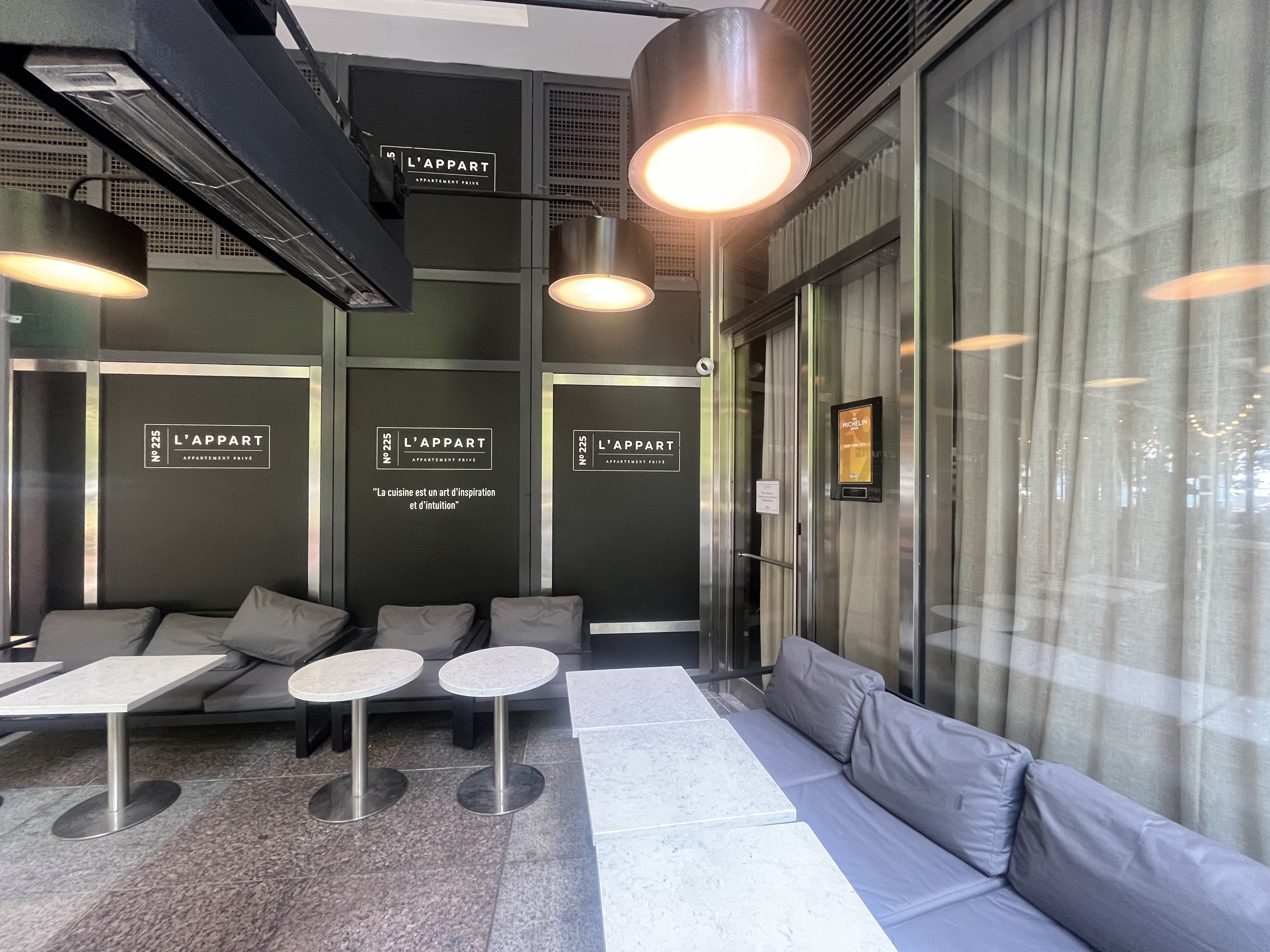
- The restaurant's exterior in 2024
- Interactive map of L'Appart

Restaurant information
- Established: April 20, 2016
- Closed: January 2024
- Location: 225 Liberty Street, New York City, New York, 10281, United States
- Coordinates: 40°42′45″N 74°00′57″W
- Website: lappartnyc.com

L'Appart was a Michelin-starred restaurant in New York City. It was located in the Le District food court at Brookfield Place, within 225 Liberty Street. Nicolas Abello was the executive chef.

In January 2024, the restaurant announced its closure and that it would become a private event space.

== See also ==
- List of Michelin-starred restaurants in New York City
