= Café Gray =

Defunct restaurant in New York City, U.S.

- Interactive map of Café Gray

Restaurant information
- Established: October 2004
- Closed: June 30, 2008
- Location: 10 Columbus Circle, New York City, New York, 10019, United States
- Coordinates: 40°46′6.9″N 73°58′59.5″W

Café Gray was a restaurant in New York City. The restaurant had received a Michelin star, before closing on June 30, 2008.

== See also ==
- List of defunct restaurants of the United States
- List of Michelin-starred restaurants in New York City
