= Perry Street (restaurant) =

Restaurant in New York City, U.S.

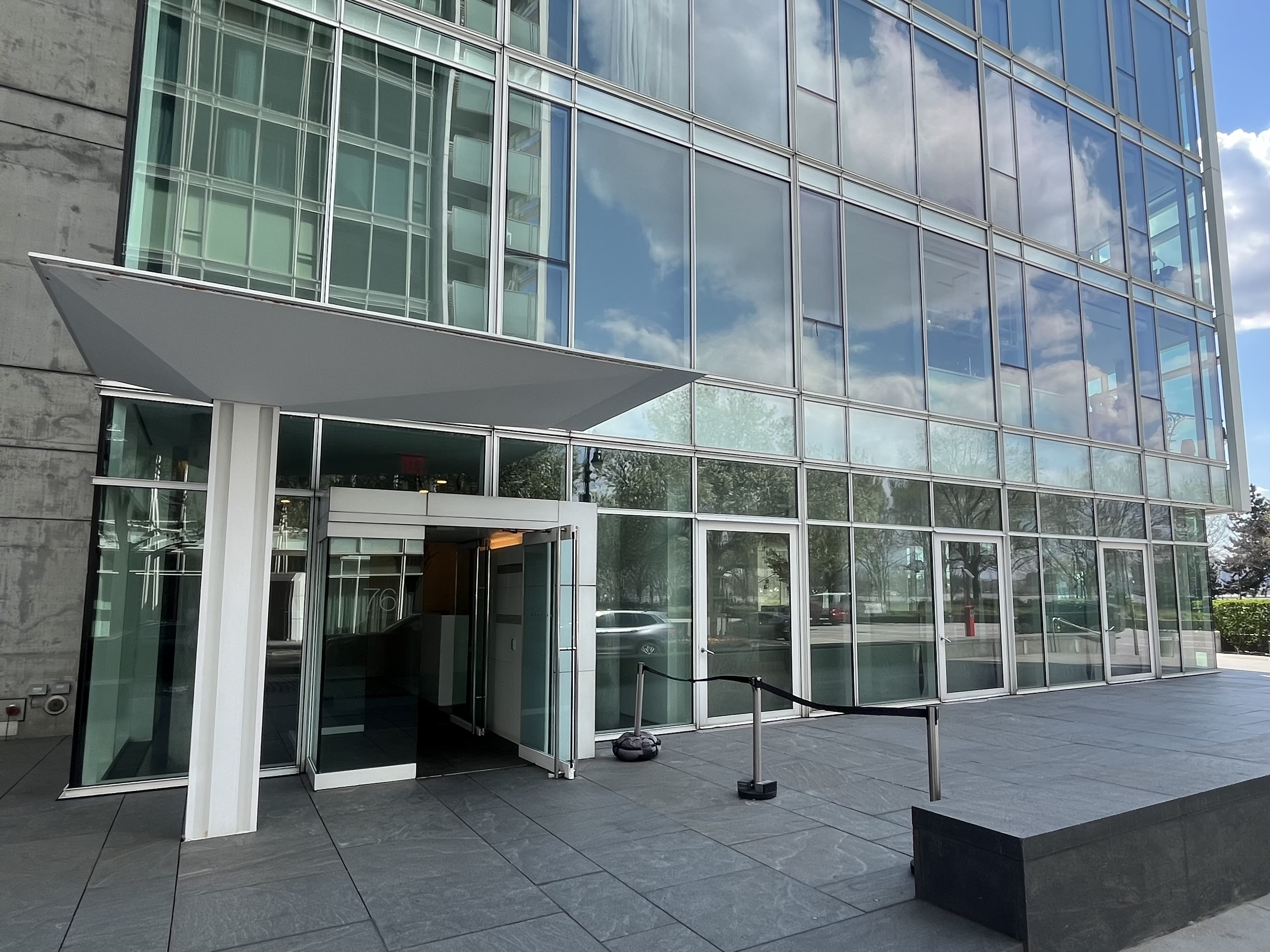
- The restaurant's exterior in April 2024
- Interactive map of Perry Street

Restaurant information
- Established: July 2005
- Location: 176 Perry Street, New York City, New York, 10014, United States
- Coordinates: 40°44′4″N 74°0′35″W

Perry Street is a restaurant in New York City. The restaurant has received a Michelin star.

== See also ==
- List of Michelin-starred restaurants in New York City
