= Rouge Tomate =

Coordinates: 40°44′25″N 73°59′46.5″W

- Interactive map of Rouge Tomate

Restaurant information
- Location: New York City, New York, United States
- Other locations: Brussels; New York City

Rouge Tomate was a restaurant which has operated in Brussels and New York City. The New York location received a Michelin star before closing.

== See also ==
- List of Michelin-starred restaurants in New York City
