= Sushi Amane =

Japanese restaurant in New York City

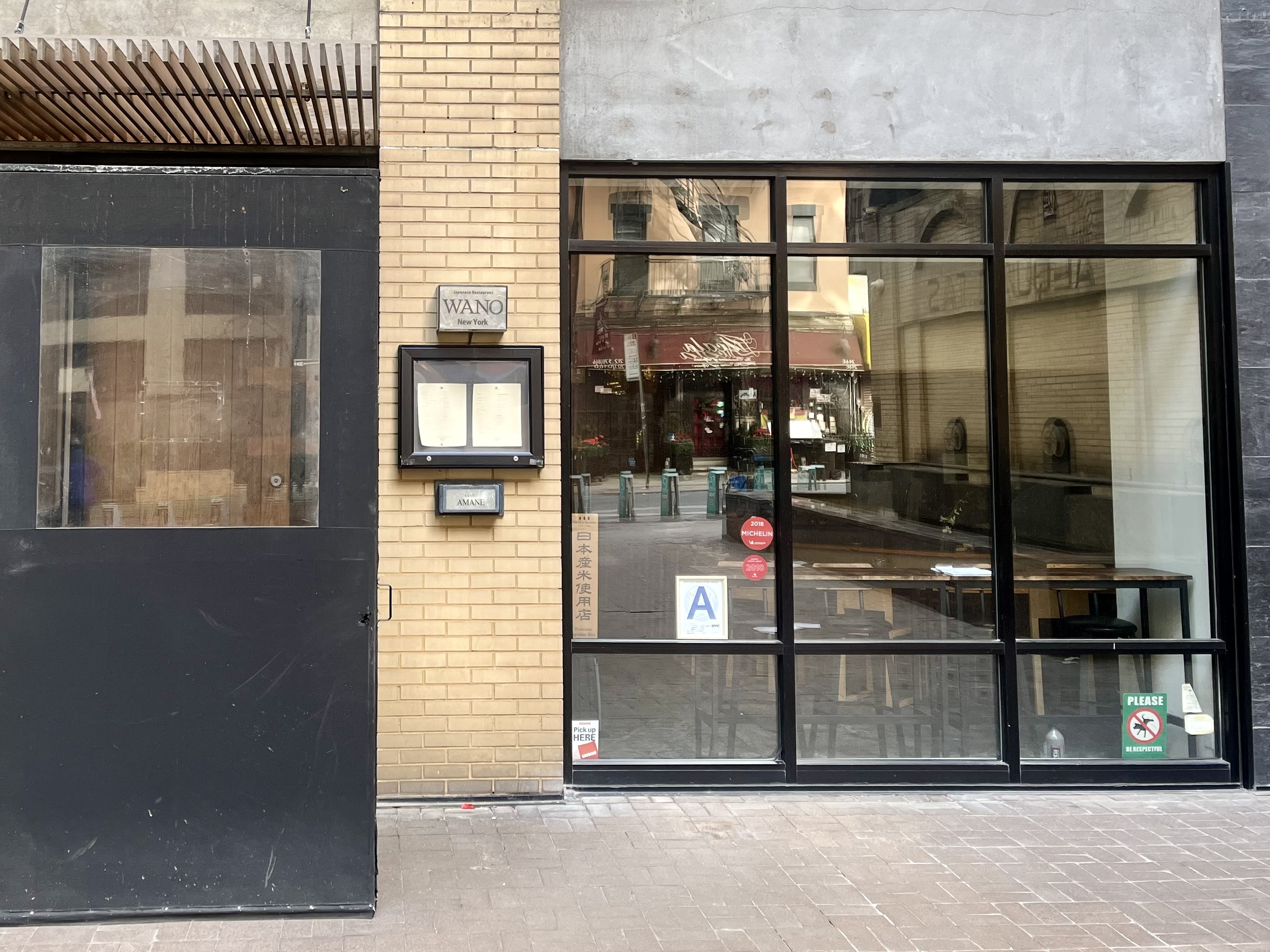
- The restaurant's exterior in 2026
- Interactive map of Sushi Amane

Restaurant information
- Established: July 13, 2017
- Food type: Japanese
- Location: 245 East 44th Street, New York City, New York, 10017, United States
- Coordinates: 40°45′5.5″N 73°58′18″W
- Website: sushi-amane.com

Sushi Amane is a Japanese restaurant in New York City. The restaurant serves sushi and has received a Michelin star.

== See also ==
- List of Japanese restaurants
- List of Michelin-starred restaurants in New York City
