= Bouley at Home =

Defunct restaurant in New York City, U.S.

- Interactive map of Bouley at Home

Restaurant information
- Established: 2017
- Closed: July 2020
- Head chef: David Bouley
- Food type: Contemporary
- Rating: (Michelin Guide)
- Location: 31 W. 21st Street, New York City, New York, United States
- Coordinates: 40°44′28″N 73°59′32″W

Bouley at Home was a Michelin-starred restaurant in the Flatiron District of Manhattan in New York City.

== See also ==
- List of Michelin-starred restaurants in New York City

== Bibliography ==
- Michelin Guide New York City 2019. Michelin Travel Publications. 2019. ISBN 978-2-06-723051-4.
