= Saul (restaurant) =

Defunct restaurant in New York City, U.S.

- Interactive map of Saul

Restaurant information
- Location: 200 Eastern Parkway, Brooklyn, New York, 11238, United States
- Coordinates: 40°40′15″N 73°57′49″W

Saul was a restaurant in Brooklyn, New York City that closed in 2016 and was replaced with The Norm under the same management chef, Saul Bolton. The restaurant had received a Michelin star.

== History ==
The restaurant was originally located at 140 Smith Street in Cobble Hill and moved to a new location at the Brooklyn Museum in 2013.

In May 2016, the restaurant's name was changed to The Norm, with Saul Bolton still running the kitchen.

== See also ==
- List of defunct restaurants of the United States
- List of Michelin-starred restaurants in New York City
