= Etats-Unis (restaurant) =

Defunct restaurant in New York City, U.S.

- Interactive map of Etats-Unis

Restaurant information
- Established: 1992
- Closed: November 2009
- Chef: Derrick Styczek
- Location: 242 East 81st Street, Manhattan, New York City, New York, 10028, United States
- Coordinates: 40°46′29″N 73°57′16.4″W

Etats-Unis (French for 'United States') was a restaurant in Manhattan, New York City, United States. Established in 1992, it had received a Michelin star, before closing permanently in 2009.

== Description ==
New York magazine described Etats-Unis as a "Manhattan chef's hangout".

== History ==
Etats-Unis opened in 1992. Jonathan Rapp and his father Tom operated the business. Derrick Styczek was the chef at the restaurant when it won a Michelin star. Etats-Unis closed in November 2009.

== See also ==
- List of defunct restaurants of the United States
- List of Michelin-starred restaurants in New York City
