= Lo Scalco =

Defunct restaurant in New York City, U.S.

- Interactive map of Lo Scalco

Restaurant information
- Closed: June 15, 2006
- Location: 313 Church Street, New York City, New York, 10013, United States
- Coordinates: 40°43′11″N 74°0′14″W

Lo Scalco was a restaurant in New York City. The restaurant had received a Michelin star, before closing. Frank Bruni of The New York Times described the restaurant as "excessively self-conscious".

== See also ==
- List of defunct restaurants of the United States
- List of Michelin-starred restaurants in New York City
