= Junoon (restaurant) =

Indian restaurant in New York City, U.S.

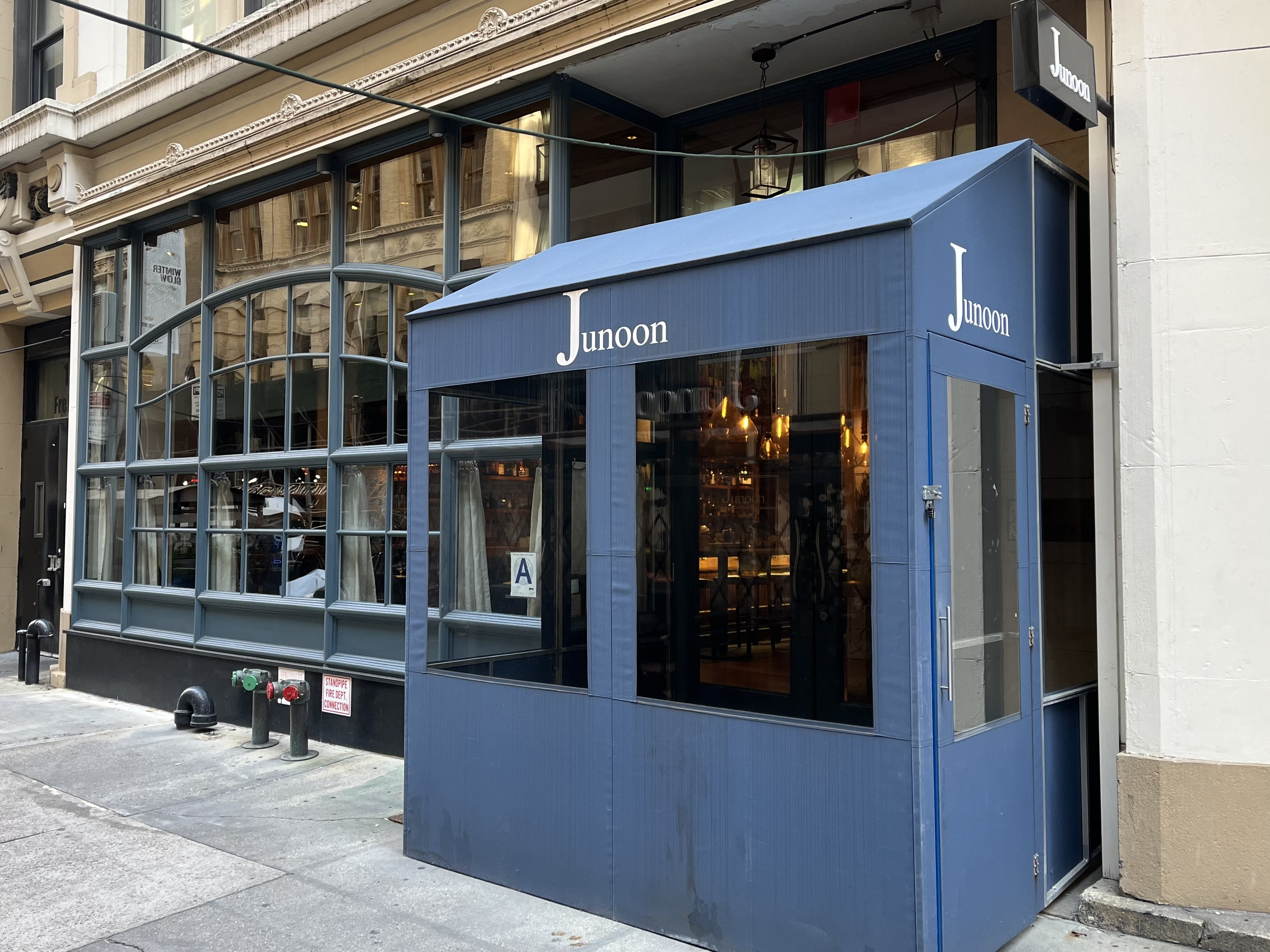
- Junoon in November 2023
- Interactive map of Junoon

Restaurant information
- Established: December 8, 2010
- Food type: Indian
- Location: 19 West 24th Street, New York City, New York, 10010, United States
- Coordinates: 40°44′34.6″N 73°59′25.7″W
- Website: junoonnyc.com

Junoon (passion in Hindi) is an Indian restaurant in New York City. It was started by chef and philanthropist Vikas Khanna and Rajesh Bhardwaj, who is the current CEO. It had a Michelin star up until 2019.

== See also ==
- List of Indian restaurants
- List of Michelin-starred restaurants in New York City
