= BLT Fish =

Defunct restaurant in New York City

- Interactive map of BLT Fish

Restaurant information
- Established: January 14, 2005
- Closed: July 25, 2014
- Location: 21 West 17th Street, New York City, New York, 10011, United States
- Coordinates: 40°44′18.9″N 73°59′36.3″W

BLT Fish ("BLT" stands for "Bistro Laurent Tourondel") was a restaurant in New York City. The restaurant opened in Chelsea on January 14, 2005. It closed on July 25, 2014.

== See also ==
- List of Michelin-starred restaurants in New York City
