= Kyo Ya =

Defunct Japanese restaurant in New York City, U.S.

- Interactive map of Kyo Ya

Restaurant information
- Closed: December 2020
- Food type: Japanese
- Location: 94 East 7th Street, New York City, New York, 10009, United States
- Coordinates: 40°43′36.2″N 73°59′7.2″W

Kyo Ya was a Japanese restaurant in New York City. The restaurant had received a Michelin star.

== See also ==
- List of defunct restaurants of the United States
- List of Japanese restaurants
- List of Michelin-starred restaurants in New York City
