= Brushstroke (restaurant) =

Defunct restaurant in New York City

- Interactive map of Brushstroke

Restaurant information
- Location: 30 Hudson Street, New York City, New York, 10013, United States
- Coordinates: 40°43′0″N 74°0′32.2″W

Brushstroke was a restaurant in New York City. The restaurant operated from 2011 to 2018, and had received a Michelin star.

== See also ==
- List of defunct restaurants of the United States
- List of Michelin-starred restaurants in New York City
