= Contra (restaurant) =

Restaurant in New York City, United States

- Interactive map of Contra

Restaurant information
- Rating: Michelin Guide
- Location: 138 Orchard Street, New York City, New York, 10002, United States
- Coordinates: 40°43′11.7″N 73°59′21.2″W

Contra was a restaurant in New York City, New York, United States. Established in 2013, the fine dining establishment served American cuisine and at one point received a Michelin star. Time Out New York rated the restaurant 2 out of 5 stars. The restaurant closed on October 28, 2023.

== See also ==
- List of defunct restaurants of the United States
- List of Michelin-starred restaurants in New York City
