= Rosanjin (restaurant) =

Defunct restaurant in New York City, U.S.

- Interactive map of Rosanjin

Restaurant information
- Established: December 2006
- Location: 141 Duane Street, New York City, New York, 10013, United States
- Coordinates: 40°42′59.3″N 74°0′28.2″W

Rosanjin was a Michelin-starred restaurant in New York City.

== See also ==
- List of defunct restaurants of the United States
- List of Michelin-starred restaurants in New York City
