= The Finch =

Restaurant in New York City, U.S.

- Interactive map of The Finch

Restaurant information
- Established: 2014
- Closed: 2020
- Food type: American
- Location: 212 Greene Avenue, Brooklyn, New York, 11238, United States
- Coordinates: 40°41′12.9″N 73°57′46.4″W

The Finch was a restaurant in New York City. The restaurant served American cuisine and had received a Michelin star.

== See also ==
- List of Michelin-starred restaurants in New York City
