= Piora (restaurant) =

Defunct restaurant in New York City, U.S.

- Interactive map of Piora

Restaurant information
- Established: 2013
- Location: 430 Hudson Street, New York City, New York, 10014, United States
- Coordinates: 40°43′50.4″N 74°0′23.7″W

Piora was a restaurant in New York City. The restaurant had received a Michelin star.

== See also ==
- List of defunct restaurants of the United States
- List of Michelin-starred restaurants in New York City
