= Faro (restaurant) =

Restaurant in New York City, U.S.

- Interactive map of Faro

Restaurant information
- Established: 2015
- Closed: March 26, 2023
- Food type: American; Italian
- Location: 436 Jefferson Street, Brooklyn, New York, 11237, United States
- Coordinates: 40°42′27″N 73°55′22.6″W

Faro was a restaurant in New York City. The restaurant served American and Italian cuisine, and received a Michelin star.

== See also ==
- List of Michelin-starred restaurants in New York City
