= Telepan =

Defunct restaurant in New York City, U.S.

- Interactive map of Telepan

Restaurant information
- Established: 2005
- Closed: 2016
- Food type: American
- Location: 72 West 69th Street, New York City, New York, 10023, United States
- Coordinates: 40°46′30.8″N 73°58′47.6″W

Telepan was a restaurant in New York City. The restaurant served American cuisine and had received a Michelin star, before closing.

== See also ==
- List of defunct restaurants of the United States
- List of Michelin-starred restaurants in New York City
