= Dovetail (restaurant) =

Defunct restaurant in New York City

- Interactive map of Dovetail

Restaurant information
- Closed: June 30, 2018
- Food type: American
- Location: 103 West 77th Street, New York City, New York, 10024, United States
- Coordinates: 40°46′51.2″N 73°58′36″W

Dovetail was a restaurant in New York City. John Fraser was the chef and owner, until he sold the business to partners in 2018. Established in 2007, the restaurant served American cuisine and had received a Michelin star.

== See also ==
- List of defunct restaurants of the United States
- List of Michelin-starred restaurants in New York City
