= Alto (restaurant) =

Defunct restaurant in New York City, U.S.

- Interactive map of Alto

Restaurant information
- Closed: March 4, 2011
- Food type: Italian
- Location: 11 East 53rd Street, New York City, New York, 10022, United States
- Coordinates: 40°45′36″N 73°58′29″W

Alto was an Italian restaurant in New York City. The restaurant had received a Michelin star.

== See also ==
- List of defunct restaurants of the United States
- List of Michelin-starred restaurants in New York City
