= Günter Seeger =

Restaurant in New York City, U.S.

- Interactive map of Günter Seeger

Restaurant information
- Established: 2016
- Closed: 2019
- Location: 641 Hudson Street, New York City, New York, 10014, United States
- Coordinates: 40°44′21″N 74°00′21″W

Günter Seeger NY was a restaurant in the West Village of Manhattan in New York City. It had received a Michelin star.

== History ==
The restaurant opened in 2016 and closed in 2019.

== See also ==
- List of Michelin-starred restaurants in New York City
