= Soto (restaurant) =

Defunct Japanese restaurant in New York City, U.S.

- Interactive map of Soto

Restaurant information
- Food type: Japanese
- Location: 357 Sixth Avenue, New York City, New York, 10014, United States
- Coordinates: 40°43′56″N 74°0′3″W

Soto was a restaurant in New York City. The restaurant served sushi and had received two Michelin stars before closing in December 2016.

== See also ==
- List of defunct restaurants of the United States
- List of Japanese restaurants
- List of Michelin-starred restaurants in New York City
