= Casa Enrique =

Mexican restaurant in New York City

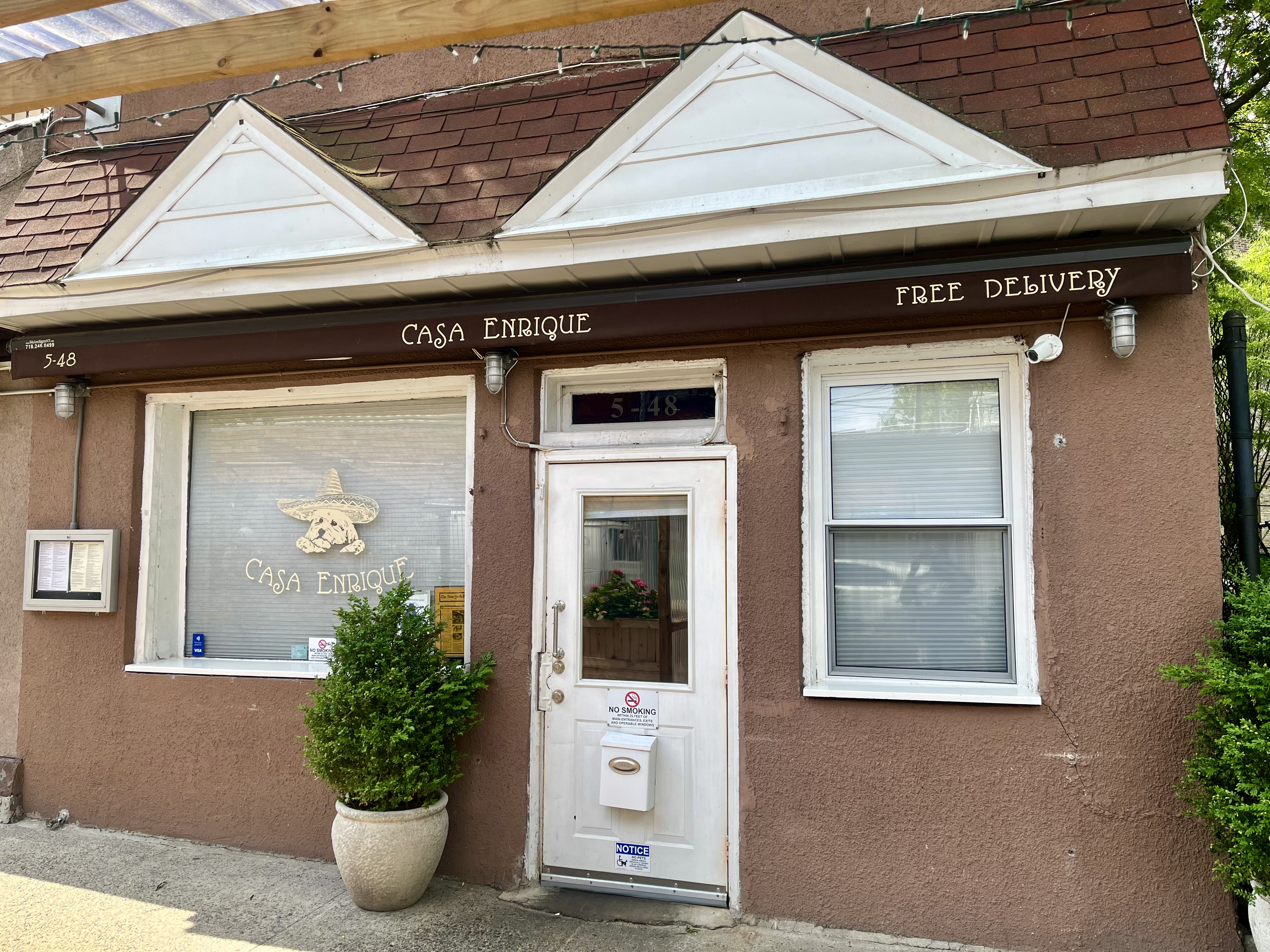
- Casa Enrique in 2024
- Interactive map of Casa Enrique

Restaurant information
- Established: 2012
- Owners: Winston Kulok, Luis Aguilar and Chef Cosme Aguilar
- Manager: Luis Aguilar
- Head chef: Chef Cosme Aguilar
- Food type: Mexican
- Rating: 4.6 Stars
- Location: 5-48 49th Avenue, Long Island City, Queens, New York, United States
- Coordinates: 40°44′36.3″N 73°57′15.8″W
- Website: https://casaenriquelic.com/casa-enrique

Casa Enrique is a Mexican restaurant in New York City, New York. The restaurant has received a Michelin star.

== History ==
Chef Cosme Aguilar was working at the Café Henri in November 2009 when his brother, Luis Aguilar, pitched the idea of opening their own Mexican restaurant to prepare the dishes they made as kids in the State of Chiapas. Cosme was hesitant at first but soon agreed with his brother. On March 15, 2012, Chef Cosme Aguilar and Luis Aguilar opened Casa Enrique. In September 2014, Casa Enrique was awarded its first Michelin Star, but lost it as of 2023.

== See also ==
- List of Mexican restaurants
- List of Michelin-starred restaurants in New York City
