= Laut (restaurant) =

Restaurant in New York City

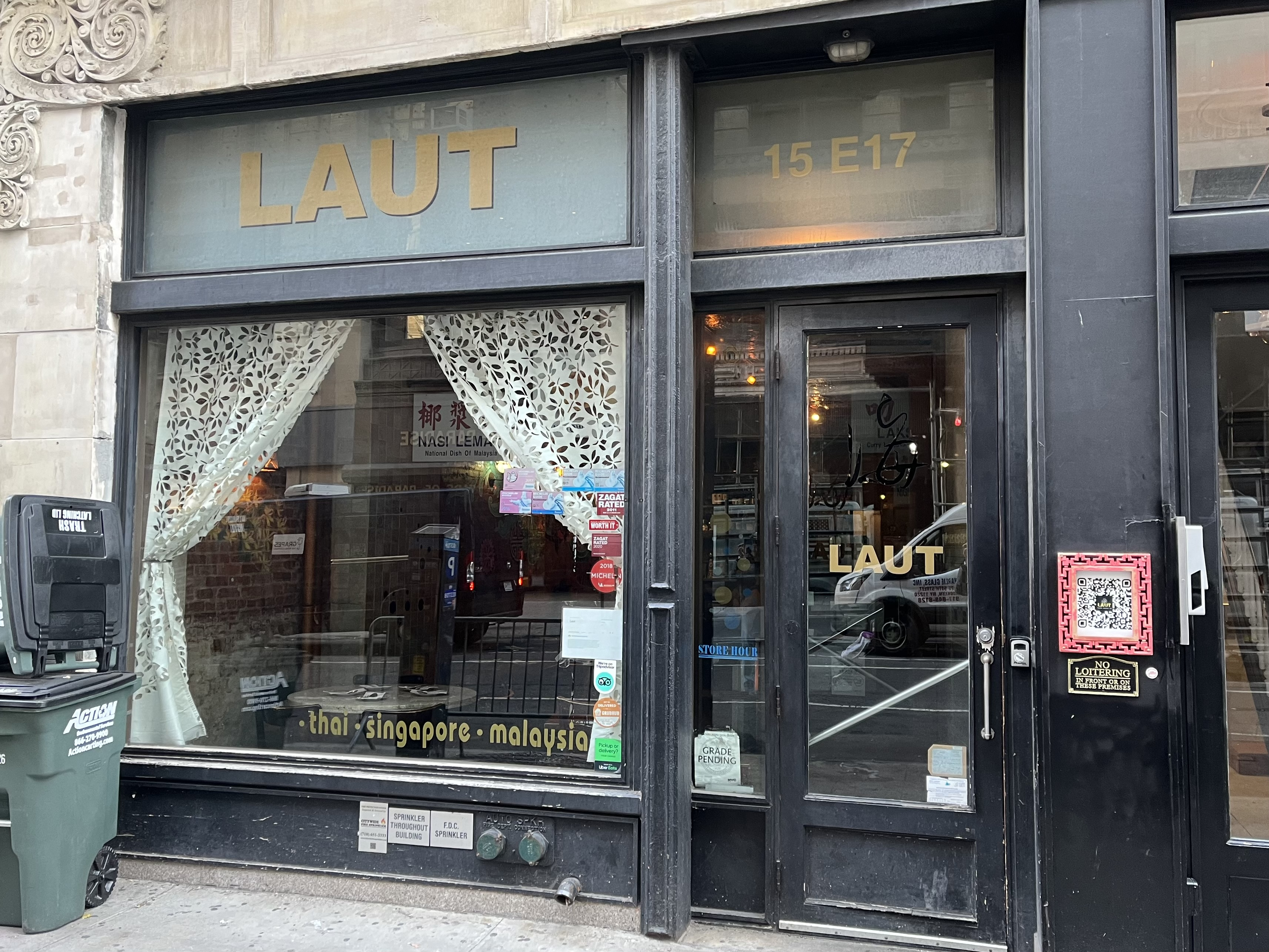
- Laut in November 2023
- Interactive map of Laut

Restaurant information
- Established: 2008
- Owner: Fungi Hospitality
- Head chef: Salil Mehta
- Food type: Malaysian, Thai
- Dress code: Casual
- Rating: Michelin Guide (2011-2012)
- Location: 15 East 17th Street, New York City, New York, 10003, United States
- Coordinates: 40°44′15.3″N 73°59′28″W
- Website: lautnyc.com

Laut(translated to "the sea" in Malay) is a restaurant in the Flatiron District of Manhattan, New York City. The restaurant specializes in Malaysian and Thai cuisine. In 2011, Laut became the first Malaysian restaurant in New York City to receive a Michelin star, which it retained in 2012 before losing the designation the following year.

The restaurant is led by chef Salil Mehta, who is also the co-owner of Fungi Hospitality. Mehta operates several other Southeast Asian–inspired establishments in New York, including Kebab au Sharab (Indian), Kanyakumari (coastal Indian), Wau (Malaysian), and the cocktail bars Singlish and Jelas. He previously operated Singapura (Singaporean/Malaysian), Pasar Malam by Laut (Malaysian), and Kebaya (Peranakan Malaysian).

== See also ==
- List of Michelin-starred restaurants in New York City
