= Restaurant Ki =

Korean restaurant in Los Angeles, California, U.S.

- Interactive map of Restaurant Ki

Restaurant information
- Established: January 2025
- Head chef: Ki Kim
- Food type: Korean
- Rating: (Michelin Guide)
- Location: 111 San Pedro Street, Los Angeles, California, 90012, United States
- Coordinates: 34°3′0″N 118°14′29″W
- Seating capacity: 12-seat counter
- Website: restaurantki.com

Restaurant Ki is a Michelin-starred Korean restaurant in the Little Tokyo neighborhood of Los Angeles, United States.

== Background ==
Restaurant Ki has a 12-seat counter and only offers one seating per evening beginning at 6:30pm. It was opened in January 2025. Ki Kim, its head chef, previously worked at restaurants including Jungsik in Tribeca (winner of three Michelin stars) and Atomix (with two Michelin stars) in NoMad, Manhattan. Restaurant Ki earned a Michelin star, indicating "high quality cooking".

== See also ==
- List of Korean restaurants
- List of Michelin-starred restaurants in California
