= Corey Lee (chef) =

Korean-American chef

Corey Lee (born 1977) is a Korean-American chef and restaurateur based in San Francisco. In 2014, his flagship restaurant, Benu, became the first in San Francisco to receive three Stars from the Michelin Guide, making Lee the first Korean chef to garner that accolade. In 2019, Benu made its debut on The World's 50 Best Restaurants. Lee is also a two-time James Beard Award winner and a goodwill ambassador to Seoul.

== Early life and career ==
Born in Seoul, South Korea, Lee moved to the U.S. with his family in 1982. At age 17, he began his career in restaurants at Blue Ribbon Sushi in New York. He then went on to work and stage at fine dining institutions such as Pied à Terre, The Restaurant Marco Pierre White, Lucas Carton, Guy Savoy, Daniel, and Lespinasse. In 2001, he began what would be his nine-year working relationship with Thomas Keller at The French Laundry. During that time, he also spent a year opening Per Se in New York City, returning to The French Laundry as head chef.

In 2010, Lee opened Benu in San Francisco and within 6 months was included in The New York Times list of "10 Restaurants Worth a Plane Ride". Benu has maintained three Stars from the Michelin Guide since 2014, and celebrated ten consecutive years of receiving three Stars in 2024. It has also won the AAA Five Diamond Award, 5 stars from the Forbes Travel Guide, and a James Beard Award for Best Wine Program. Benu's fixed menu incorporates ingredients and techniques from many different cuisines, including Korean and Cantonese.

== Media and events ==
Lee has presented at several international culinary events such as Madrid Fusion, Gastronomika, Melbourne Food and Wine Festival, Global Leaders Forum, and Seoul Gourmet. He has also given guest lectures at Harvard University and UCSF. His television appearances include Charlie Rose and Korean documentaries produced by KBS, Olive TV, Arirang, and TV Chosun.

In 2015, he authored Benu–a collection of recipes and essays that explores the restaurant's food, influences, and collaborators–with forewords by Thomas Keller and David Chang, published by Phaidon and designed by Julia Hasting.

Lee also acted as food consultant for the film Coming Home Again, directed by Wayne Wang and based on The New Yorker short story by Chang-Rae Lee.

== Other projects ==
In 2016, Lee opened In Situ inside the San Francisco Museum of Modern Art. Its website described it as an exhibition restaurant that "[brings] together a revolving collection of culinary influencers, innovators, and icons to make their contributions accessible for greater public engagement." Hailed as "America's Most Original New Restaurant" by The New York Times, it earned one Michelin Star and won the 2018 James Beard Award for Best Restaurant Design (76 Seats and Over).

In November 2021, he opened San Ho Won, a "Korean, charcoal BBQ restaurant located in the Mission District of San Francisco." It too received one Michelin Star within a year of opening. In addition, it was named #1 Best New Restaurant in America by Robb Report and included in The New York Times 2022 list of their 50 favorite restaurants in America.

In 2024, Lee launched Na Oh in partnership with Hyundai Motor Company at their Innovation Center in Singapore. Na Oh collaborated with dozens of master Korean artisans and is a restaurant where diners can experience not only traditional Korean cuisine, but also beautiful Korean craft and design.

== Awards and honors ==
- 3 Stars, Michelin Guide, Benu
- Ten Years of Three Michelin Stars, Benu, 2024
- 1 Star, Michelin Guide, San Ho Won
- 1 Star, Michelin Guide, In Situ
- Rising Star Chef, James Beard Foundation, 2006
- Best Chef: West, James Beard Foundation, 2017
- Outstanding Wine Program, James Beard Foundation, 2019
- Food & Wine Magazine Best New Chef, 2012
- Eater 38 Icon (Named one of America's 38 Essential Restaurants for five consecutive times)
- Entered the list of The World's 50 Best Restaurants, 2019
- Ranked 28th in The World's 50 Best Restaurants, 2021
- The 40 Most Important Restaurants of the Decade, Esquire
- The Most Important Restaurants of the Decade, Food & Wine
- 5 Stars, Forbes Travel Guide
- 4 Stars, San Francisco Chronicle
- Five Diamond Award, AAA
