= Korean Temple Bell =

Bronze bell in Portland, Oregon

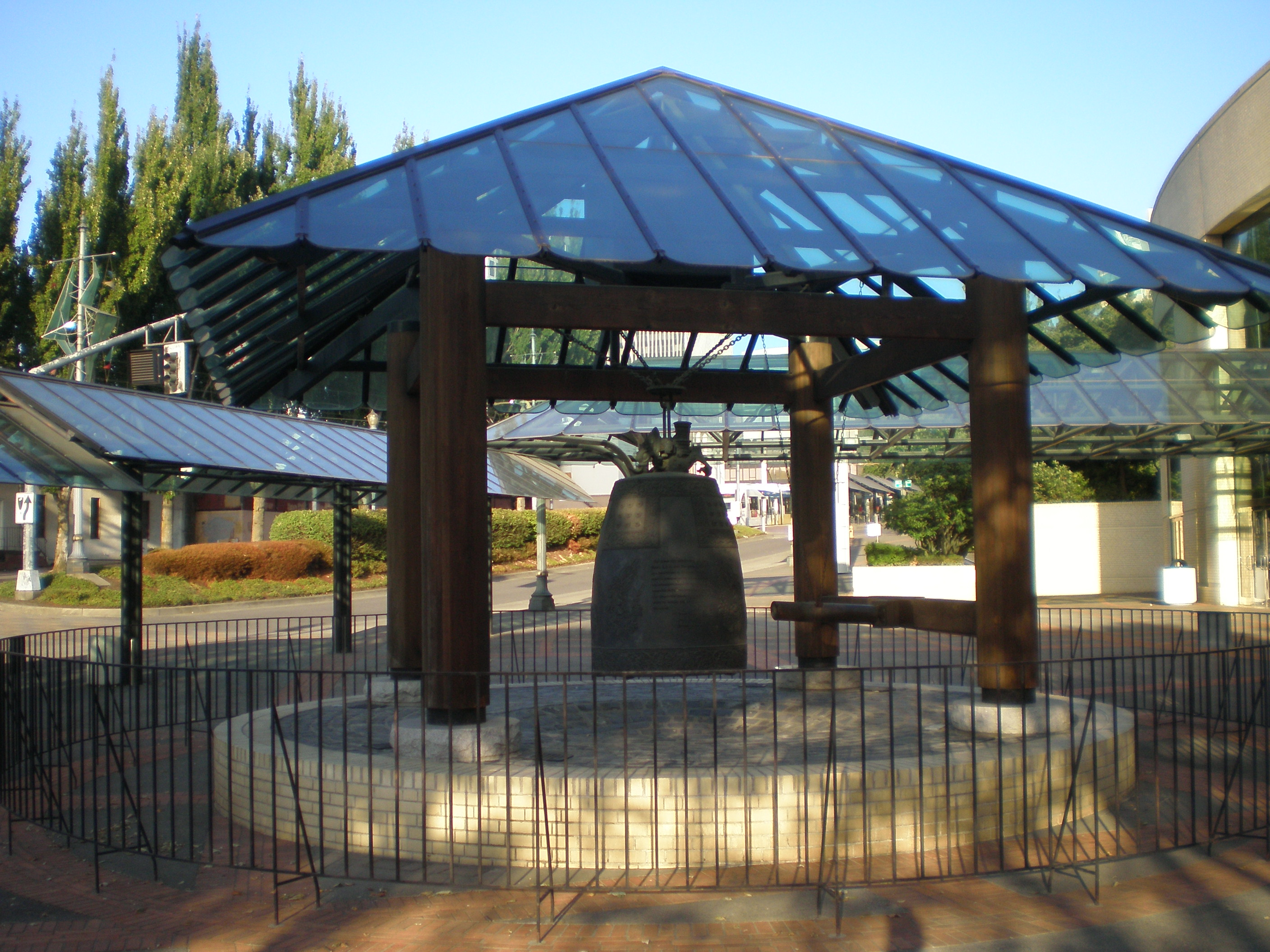
- The bell in 2011
- Artist: Unknown
- Year: 1989
- Type: Sculpture
- Medium: Bronze
- Location: Portland, Oregon, United States; 45.52984°N 122.66382°W

Korean Temple Bell, part of the sound installation by composer Robert Coburn called Bell and Wind Environment (along with Bell Circles II), is an outdoor bronze bell by an unknown Korean artist, housed in a brick and granite pagoda outside the Oregon Convention Center in Portland, Oregon, United States.

== History ==
The temple bell was gifted by the people of Ulsan, South Korea, and dedicated on January 11, 1989. It cost $59,000 and was funded through the Convention Center's One Percent for Art program and by private donors. According to the Smithsonian Institution, some residents raised concerns about the bell's religious symbolism and its placement outside a public building. It was surveyed by the Smithsonian's "Save Outdoor Sculpture!" program in July 1993, though its condition was undetermined.

== See also ==
- 1989 in art
- History of Korean Americans in Portland, Oregon
- Host Analog (1991) and The Dream (1998), also located outside the Oregon Convention Center
- Liberty Bell (Portland, Oregon)
- Victory Bell (University of Portland)
