= Bell Circles II =

Bronze bell in Portland, Oregon, U.S.

- The bell in 2015
- Artist: Unknown
- Type: Sculpture
- Medium: Bronze
- Condition: "Treatment needed" (1993)
- Location: Portland, Oregon, United States; 45.52961°N 122.66232°W

Bell Circles II, also known as Sapporo Friendship Bell and part of the sound installation by composer Robert Coburn called Bell and Wind Environment (along with Korean Temple Bell), is an outdoor bronze bell by an unknown Japanese artist, housed in a brick and granite pagoda outside the Oregon Convention Center in Portland, Oregon, United States. The temple bell was presented by the people of Portland's sister city Sapporo, Japan and dedicated in February 1990. It cost $59,000 and was funded through the Convention Center's One Percent for Art program and by private donors. According to the Smithsonian Institution, some residents raised concerns about the bell's religious symbolism and its placement outside a public building. It was surveyed and considered "treatment needed" by the Smithsonian's "Save Outdoor Sculpture!" program in July 1993.

== See also ==
- 1990 in art
- Host Analog (1991) and The Dream (1998), also located outside the Oregon Convention Center
- Liberty Bell (Portland, Oregon)
- Victory Bell (University of Portland)
