= History of Korean Americans in Portland, Oregon =

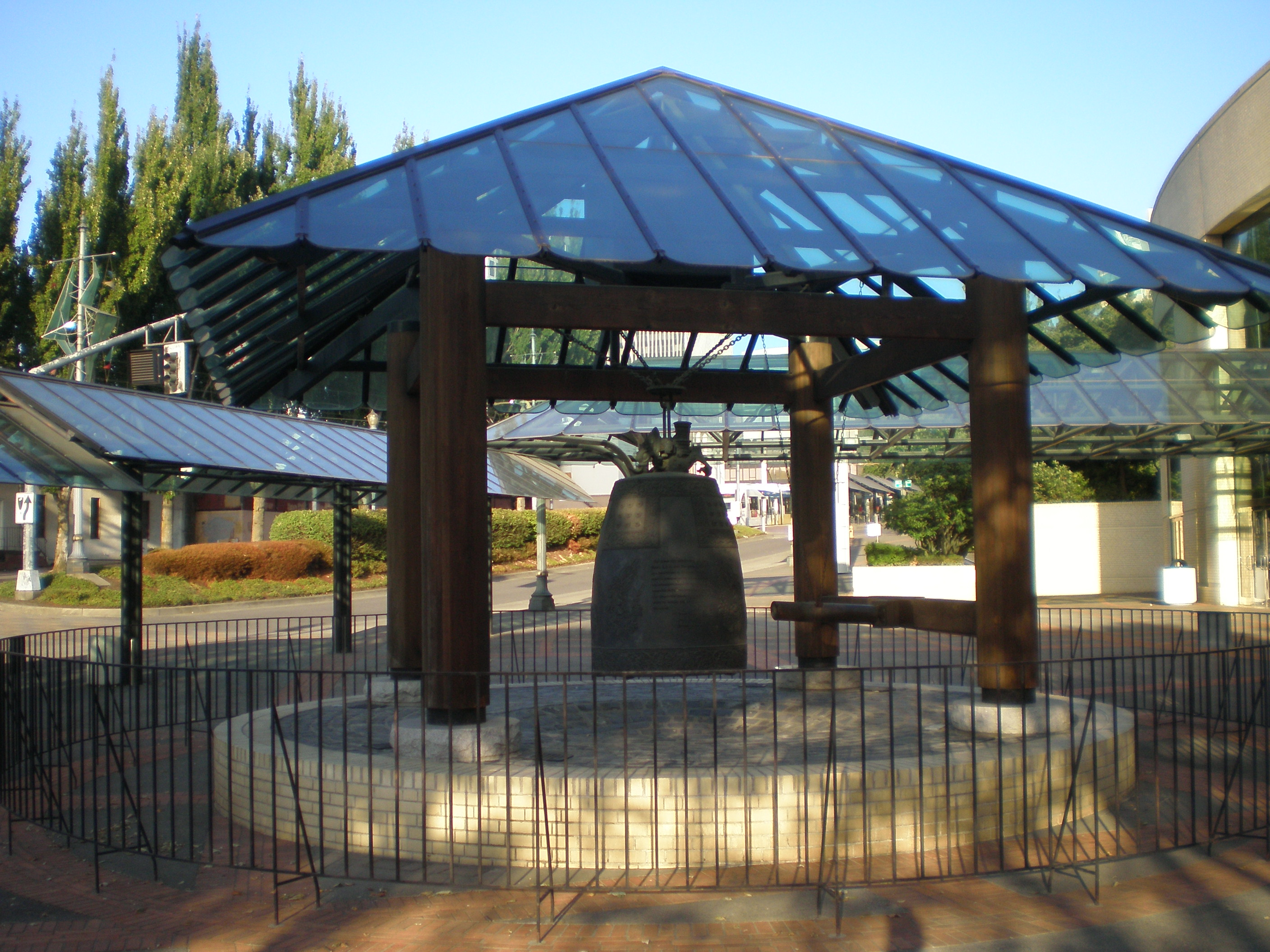
Korean Temple Bell

According to Willamette Week: "Though the first home of Portland's Korean immigrants was Gresham in the '60s, the 'Tron's manufacturing boom in the late '70s brought a wave of Korean immigrants to Beaverton in the Cedar Hills and downtown areas."

Portland has "great" Korean food, according to Willamette Week, and many Korean restaurants. Notable restaurants have included Beastro, Du's Grill, Frybaby, Han Oak, Jeju, Kim Jong Grillin', Koi Fusion, Revelry, and Toki.

Lori Stegmann became the first Korean American Commissioner on the Multnomah County Board, and has been recognized by the Korean Society of Oregon for her work.

The Korean Temple Bell is installed outside the Oregon Convention Center.

== See also ==
- Culture of Portland, Oregon
