= In Situ (restaurant) =

- Interactive map of In Situ

Restaurant information
- Established: 2016
- Food type: Haute cuisine
- Dress code: Casual
- Location: 151 3rd St, San Francisco, CA, 94103
- Coordinates: 37.785907°N 122.4008°W
- Reservations: yes
- Website: In Situ

In Situ was a restaurant located inside the San Francisco Museum of Modern Art. The concept was conceived by Corey Lee (chef), who is also the owner and chef of the nearby 3-Michelin-star-rated Benu.

Unlike many fine dining restaurants, which seek to create unique culinary offerings, In Situ based its menu on detailed reconstructions of signature dishes by other chefs from other restaurants. Lee's role in the restaurant is described in press coverage as both chef and curator. In 2021, the restaurant announced the end of its five-year operating term at SFMOMA.

== Critical response ==
In Situ received positive reviews in its first year of operation. It was named the "restaurant of the year" by the San Francisco Chronicle and "America's Most Original New Restaurant" by The New York Times. It was also awarded a Michelin star in 2017 and a James Beard Restaurant Design Award in 2018.

== See also ==
- List of Michelin-starred restaurants in California
