= Victory Bell (University of Portland) =

Bells at the University of Portland in Oregon, U.S.

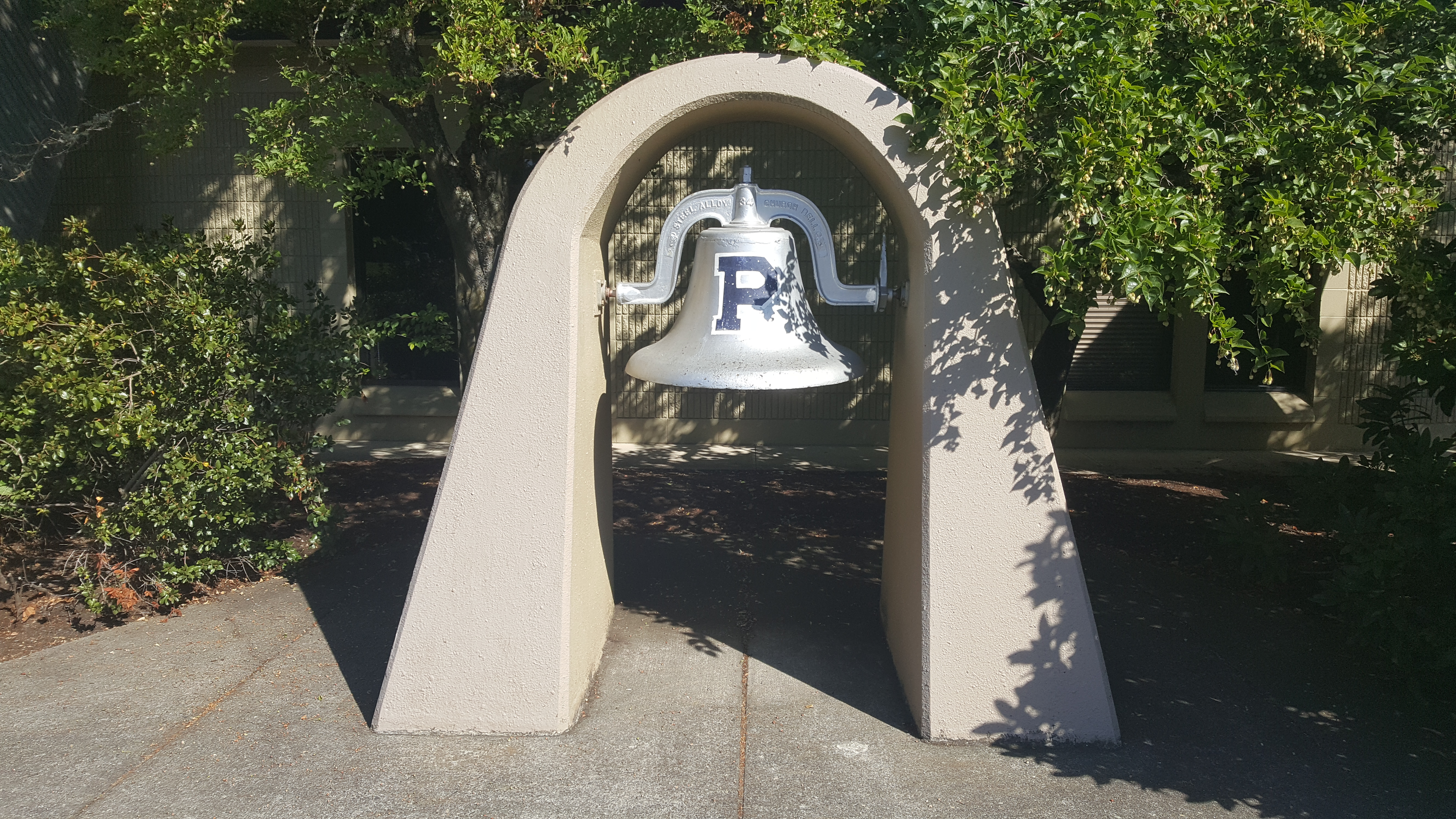
- The bell outside the Chiles Center, 2018
- Location: Portland, Oregon, United States; 45.5747°N 122.7282°W
- Owner: University of Portland

The Victory Bell refers to two bells used by the University of Portland at sporting and other events. The original is installed outside the Chiles Center. A new one was cast in 2012.

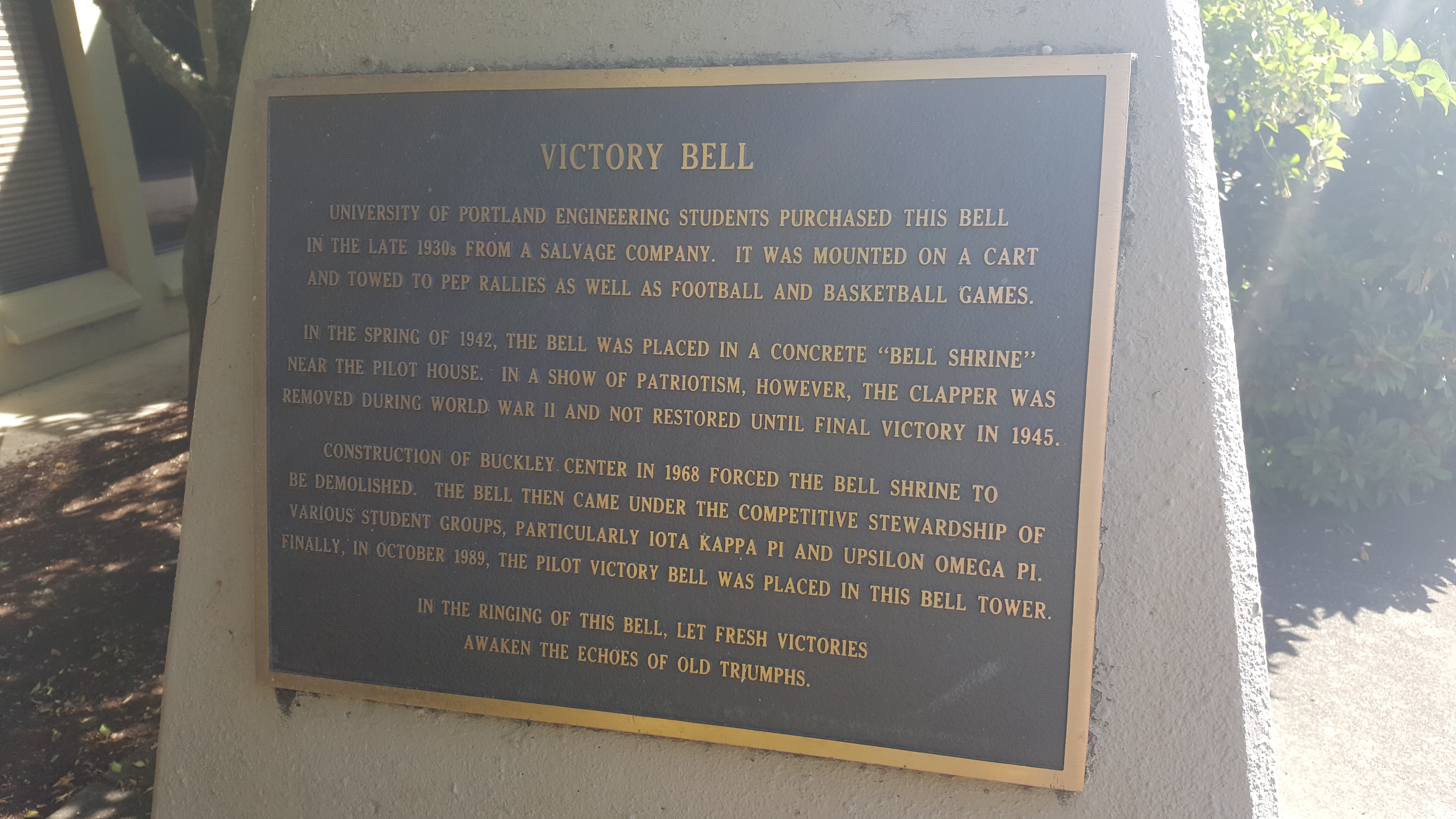
Plaque, 2018

== See also ==
- Bell Circles II
- Korean Temple Bell
- Liberty Bell (Portland, Oregon)
