= Meju (restaurant) =

Korean restaurant in New York City

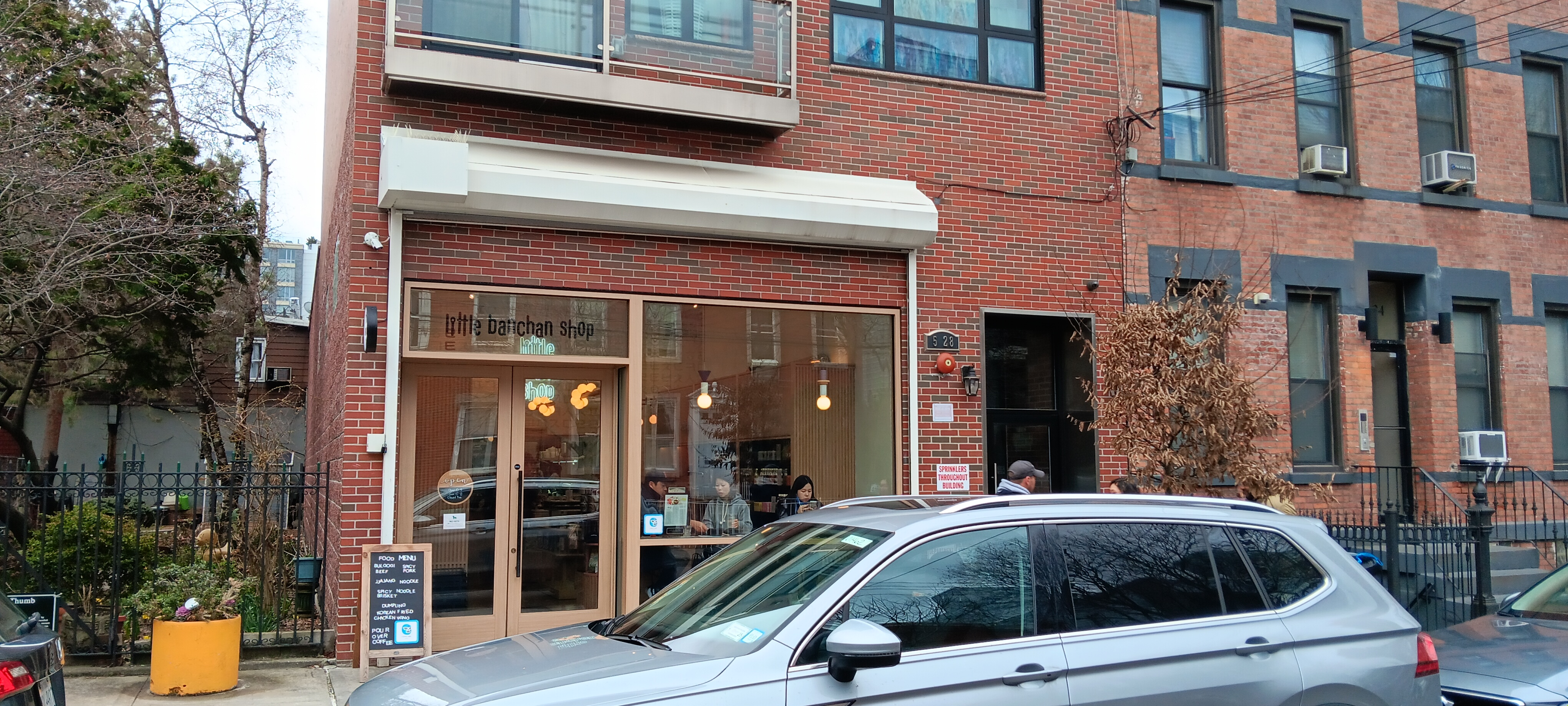
- The exterior of the Banchan Shop, a restaurant that encompasses the Michelin-starred Meju
- Interactive map of Meju

Restaurant information
- Established: 2023
- Head chef: Hooni Kim
- Food type: Korean
- Rating: (Michelin Guide)
- Location: 5-28 49th Avenue, Long Island City, New York, 11101, United States
- Coordinates: 40°44′36.9″N 73°57′18.8″W
- Seating capacity: 8

Meju is a Korean restaurant in Long Island City, Queens, New York. The restaurant has received a Michelin star. The restaurant offers a tasting menu with multiple courses, focused mainly on fermentation.

== See also ==
- List of Korean restaurants
- List of Michelin-starred restaurants in New York City
