= Paju (restaurant) =

Korean restaurant in Seattle, Washington, U.S.

- Interactive map of Paju

Restaurant information
- Food type: Korean
- Location: Seattle, Washington, United States
- Coordinates: 47°37′27.8″N 122°21′22″W
- Website: pajurestaurant.com

Paju is a Korean restaurant in Seattle's Queen Anne neighborhood, in the U.S. state of Washington.

== Description ==
The Korean restaurant Paju operates in Queen Anne, Seattle. The restaurant serves "innovative seafood-focused cuisine", according to Seattle Magazine. The menu has included Korean fried wings, gochujang-infused beef tartare, salmon carpaccio with lemon dashi and kimchi caviar, and a seafood pancake with Japanese mayo, tonkatsu sauce, and bonito flakes. Paju has also served fried rice with squid ink and quail eggs.

== Reception ==
Paju was included in The New York Times' 2021 list of the "most exciting" restaurants in the U.S., and Seattle Metropolitan's 2023 list of Seattle's 100 best restaurants. In 2023, The Infatuation said, "Squid ink-infused kimchi fried rice with bacon, truffled ribeye bulgogi topped with crisped-up quinoa and charred enoki mushrooms, and lemon verbena yellowtail with slivers of green apple make Paju the best Korean restaurant in Seattle."

== See also ==
- List of Korean restaurants
