= Okdongsik =

Korean restaurant in New York City, U.S.

- Interactive map of Okdongsik

Restaurant information
- Established: November 2022
- Head chef: Ok Dongsik
- Food type: Korean
- Dress code: Casual
- Location: 13 East 30th Street, New York City, New York, 10016, United States
- Coordinates: 40°44′44″N 73°59′08″W
- Seating capacity: 10
- Other locations: Seoul (South Korea)
- Website: www.okdongsik.net

Okdongsik (Korean: 옥동식) is a Korean restaurant in Seoul, Midtown East, New York City, and Honolulu The restaurant's original location is in Seoul was awarded a Michelin Bib Gourmand. The restaurant specializes in one dish, dwaeji gukbap (Korean: 돼지국밥), a soup (guk) made with pork ribs and rice. Along with their specialty, they serve kimchi mandu like the original restaurant, monthly rotating specials, and drinks.

== See also ==
- List of Korean restaurants
