= San Ho Won =

Korean restaurant in San Francisco, California, U.S.

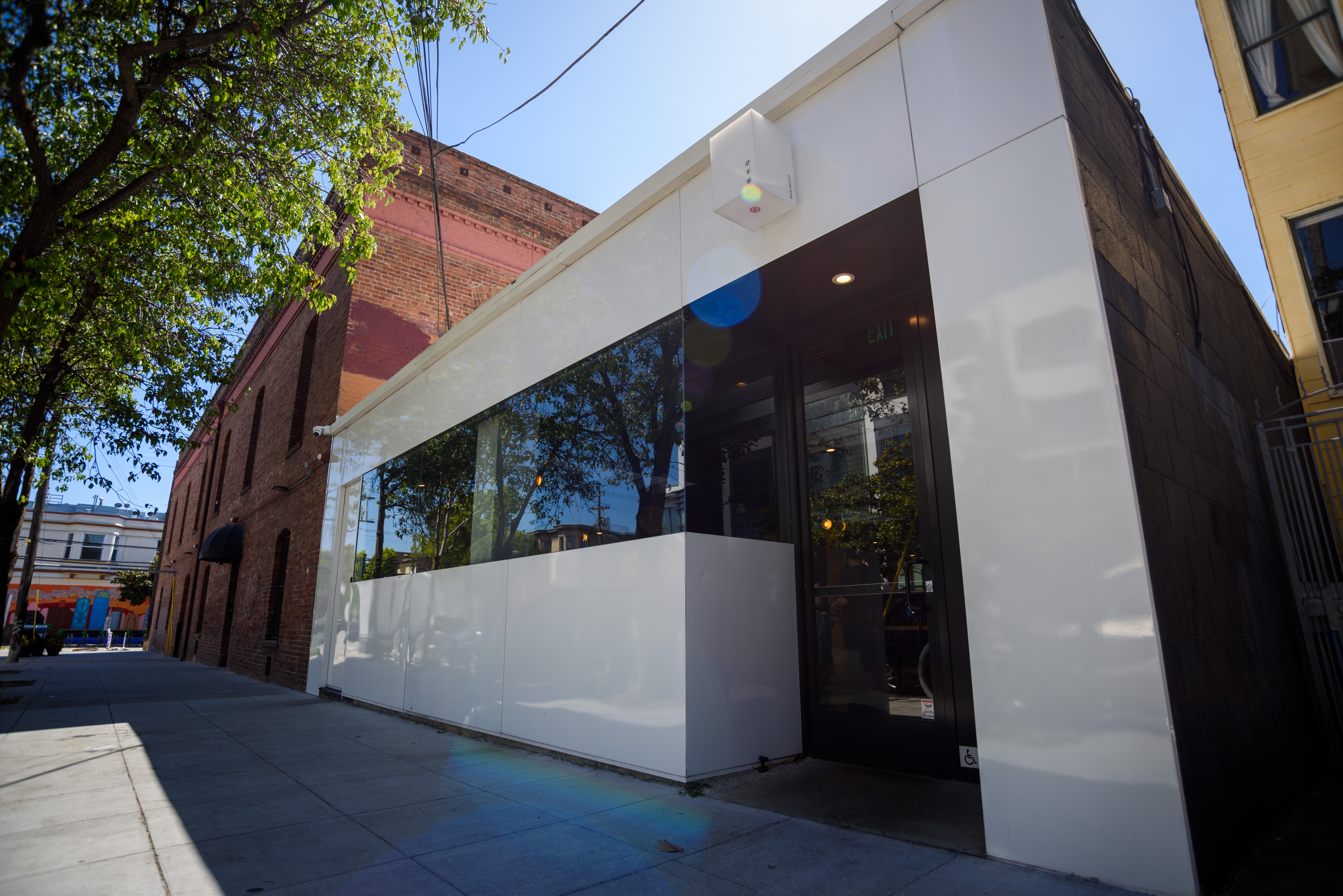
- San Ho Won's facade. The restaurant is mostly unmarked aside from a small sign above the entrance.
- Interactive map of San Ho Won

Restaurant information
- Established: November 1, 2021
- Owners: Corey Lee and Jeong-In Hwang
- Head chef: Jeong-In Hwang
- Chef: Corey Lee
- Food type: Korean cuisine, Korean barbecue
- Rating: 1 Michelin star
- Location: 2170 Bryant Street, San Francisco, California, 94110, United States
- Coordinates: 37°45′34.5″N 122°24′37″W
- Reservations: Recommended; tables by reservation only
- Website: sanhowon.com

San Ho Won (Korean: 산호원; Hanja: 山虎源) is a Korean restaurant in San Francisco's Mission District, in the U.S. state of California. It was opened by chefs Corey Lee and Jeong-In Hwang.

The restaurant has received a Michelin star.

Galbi and scallion salad

== See also ==
- List of Korean restaurants
- List of Michelin-starred restaurants in California
