= Danji =

Korean restaurant in New York City

- Interactive map of Danji

Restaurant information
- Established: December 2010
- Food type: Korean
- Location: 346 West 52nd Street, New York, New York, 10019
- Coordinates: 40°45′51″N 73°59′12″W

Danji is a Korean restaurant in New York City. Hooni Kim is the chef.

== See also ==
- List of Korean restaurants
- List of Michelin-starred restaurants in New York City
