= Kochi (restaurant) =

Korean restaurant in New York City

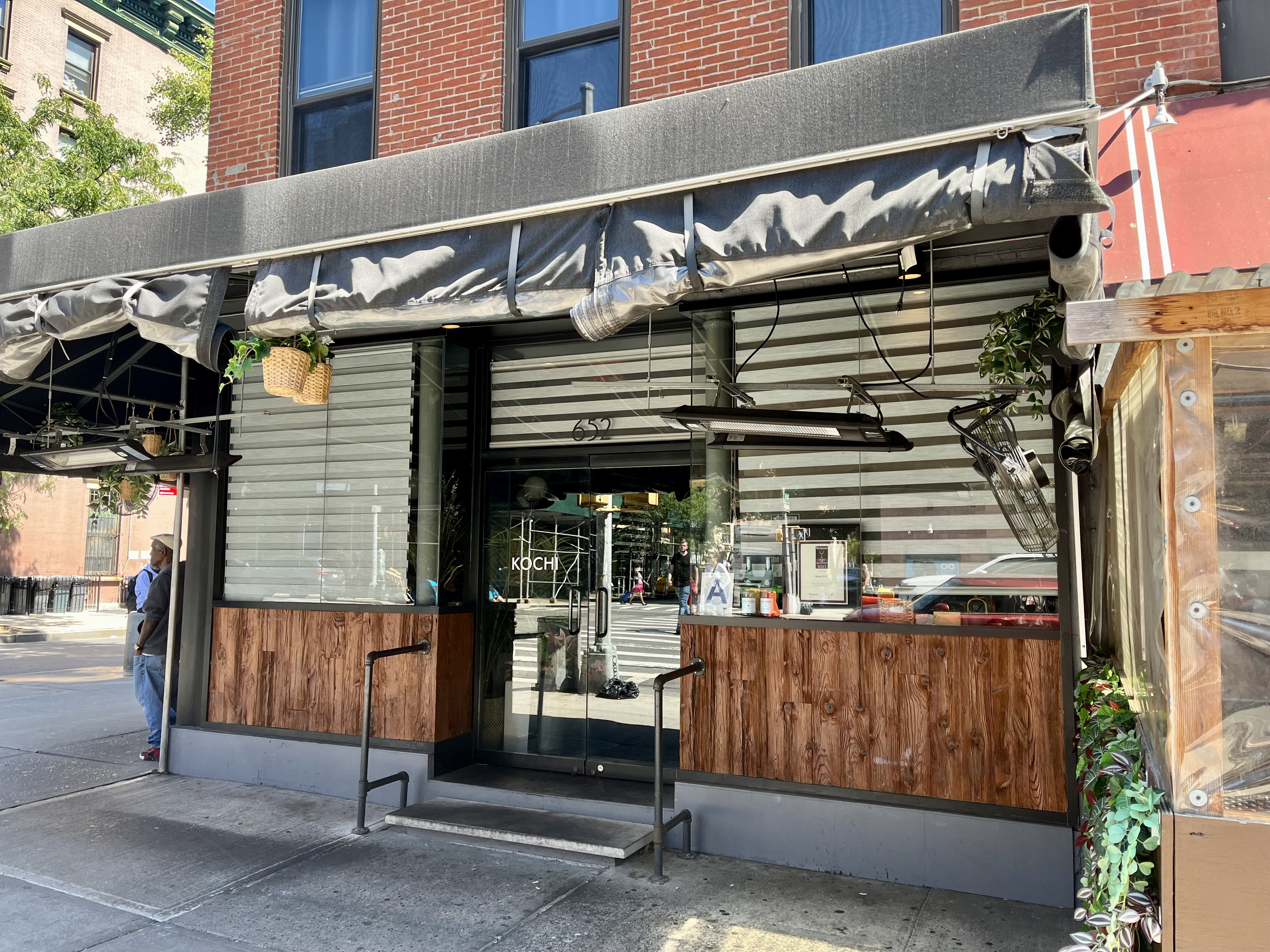
- The restaurant's exterior in 2023
- Interactive map of Kochi

Restaurant information
- Established: November 5, 2019
- Food type: Korean
- Rating: (Michelin Guide)
- Location: 652 Tenth Avenue, New York City, New York, 10036, United States
- Coordinates: 40°45′43.3″N 73°59′36.6″W
- Website: Official website

Kochi (Korean: 꼬치) is a Korean restaurant in New York City located in Hell's Kitchen. The restaurant has received a Michelin star. As per the name of the restaurant, they specialize in skewers, or kkochi in Korean, serving several as part of their 8-course tasting menu.

== See also ==
- List of Korean restaurants
- List of Michelin-starred restaurants in New York City
