= Atoboy =

Korean restaurant in New York City

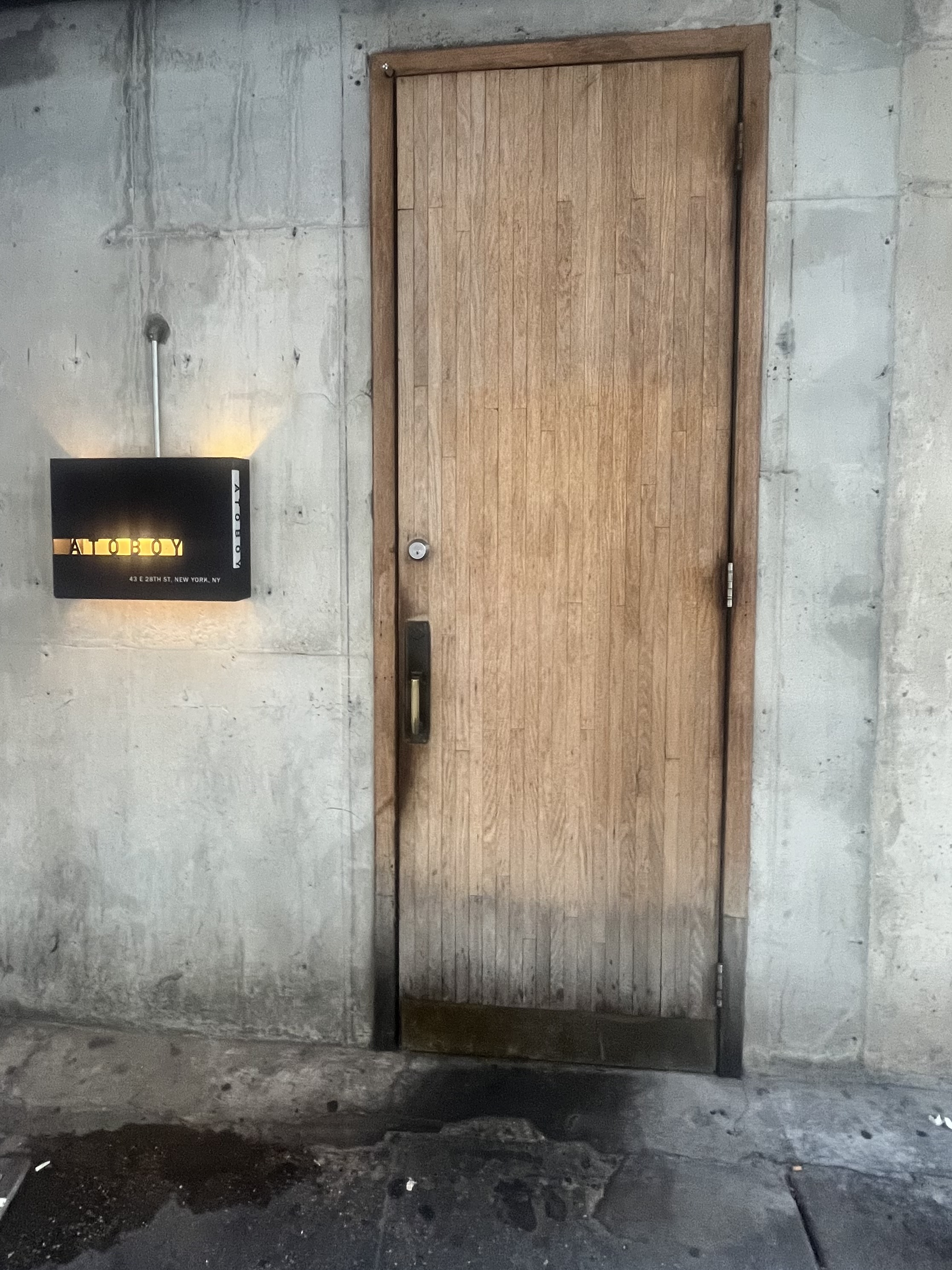
- The restaurant's exterior in 2024
- Interactive map of Atoboy

Restaurant information
- Established: 2016
- Food type: Korean
- Location: 43 East 28th Street, New York City, New York, 10016, United States
- Coordinates: 40°44′37″N 73°59′04″W
- Website: www.atoboynyc.com

Atoboy is a Korean restaurant in New York City.

== See also ==
- List of Korean restaurants
