= Revelry (restaurant) =

Defunct bar and restaurant in Portland, Oregon, U.S.

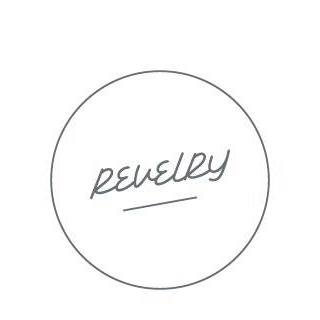
- Interactive map of Revelry

Restaurant information
- Food type: Korean
- Location: 210 Southeast Martin Luther King Jr. Boulevard, Portland, Multnomah, Oregon
- Coordinates: 45°31′16.5″N 122°39′41.5″W
- Seating capacity: 48

Revelry was a cocktail bar and Korean restaurant in Portland, Oregon, United States.

== Description ==
Revelry was located in southeast Portland's Buckman neighborhood, and served cocktails and Korean cuisine.

== History ==
Revelry opened on August 16, 2016. Chefs and co-owners Rachel Yang and Seif Chirchi partnered with locals Eric and Karen Bowler. Revelry was named Portland Monthly's "rising star restaurant". Diane Lam became chef in 2017. In November, the menu was updated to include more vegan options.

In June 2020, the owners announced plans to close permanently, during the COVID-19 pandemic. Revelry had attempted to operate via take-out during the pandemic.

== Reception ==
In his review of the restaurant, Michael Russell of The Oregonian summarized, "Some eaters might find Revelry's fusion take on Korean cuisine to be too entry-level -- the menu has more in common with Tasty N Alder's Korean Fried Chicken bowl than it does with restaurants in Beaverton or Seoul. For those less familiar with galbi and dukbokki, this won't be a problem (and it doesn't stop much of the menu from being delicious)." Eater Portland's Alex Frane included Revelry in his 2019 list of "18 Portland Bar Snacks Ideal for Any Night Out".

== See also ==
- COVID-19 pandemic in Portland, Oregon
- History of Korean Americans in Portland, Oregon
- Impact of the COVID-19 pandemic on the restaurant industry in the United States
- List of Korean restaurants
