= List of Korean restaurants =

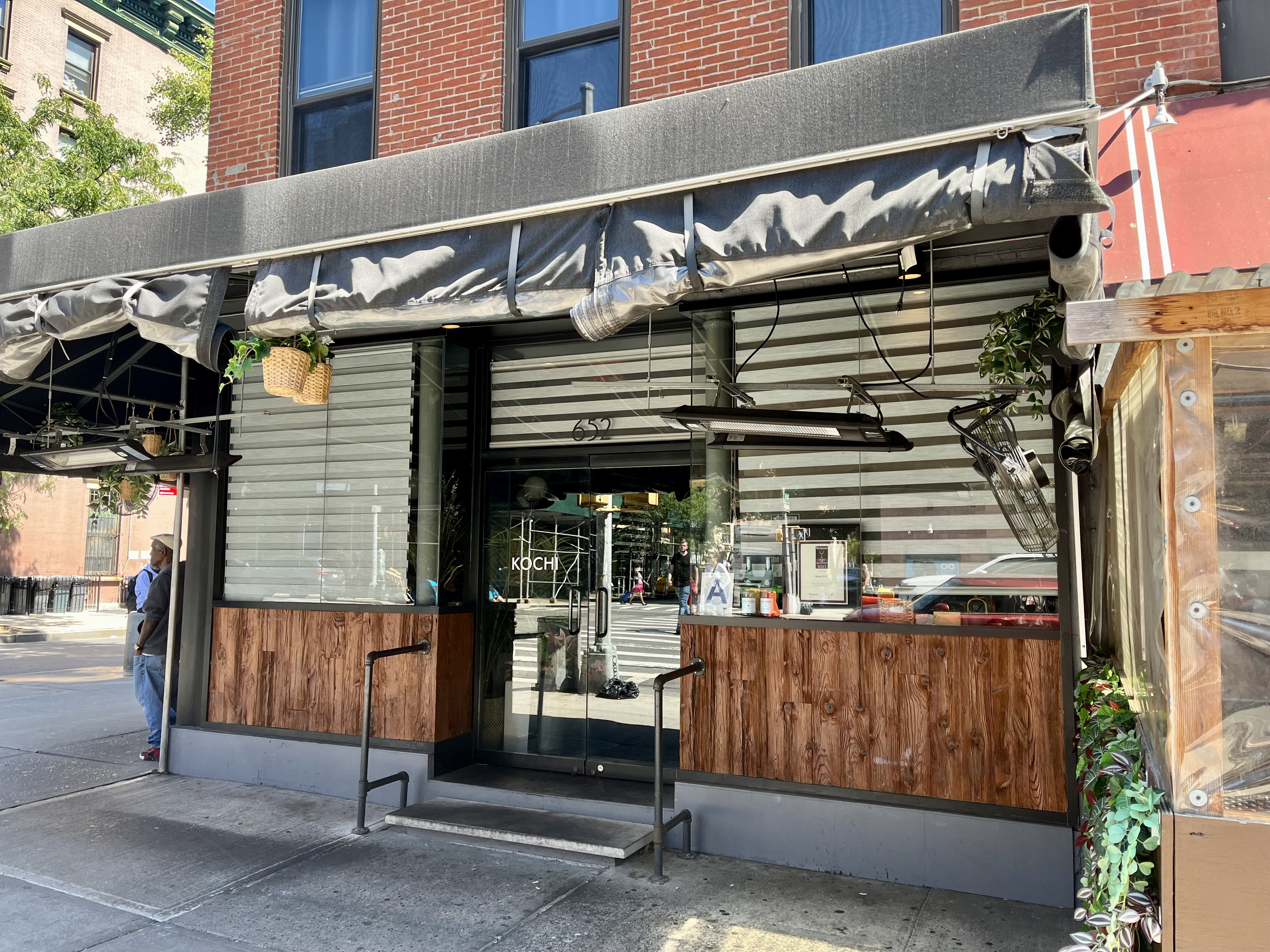
Kochi, New York City

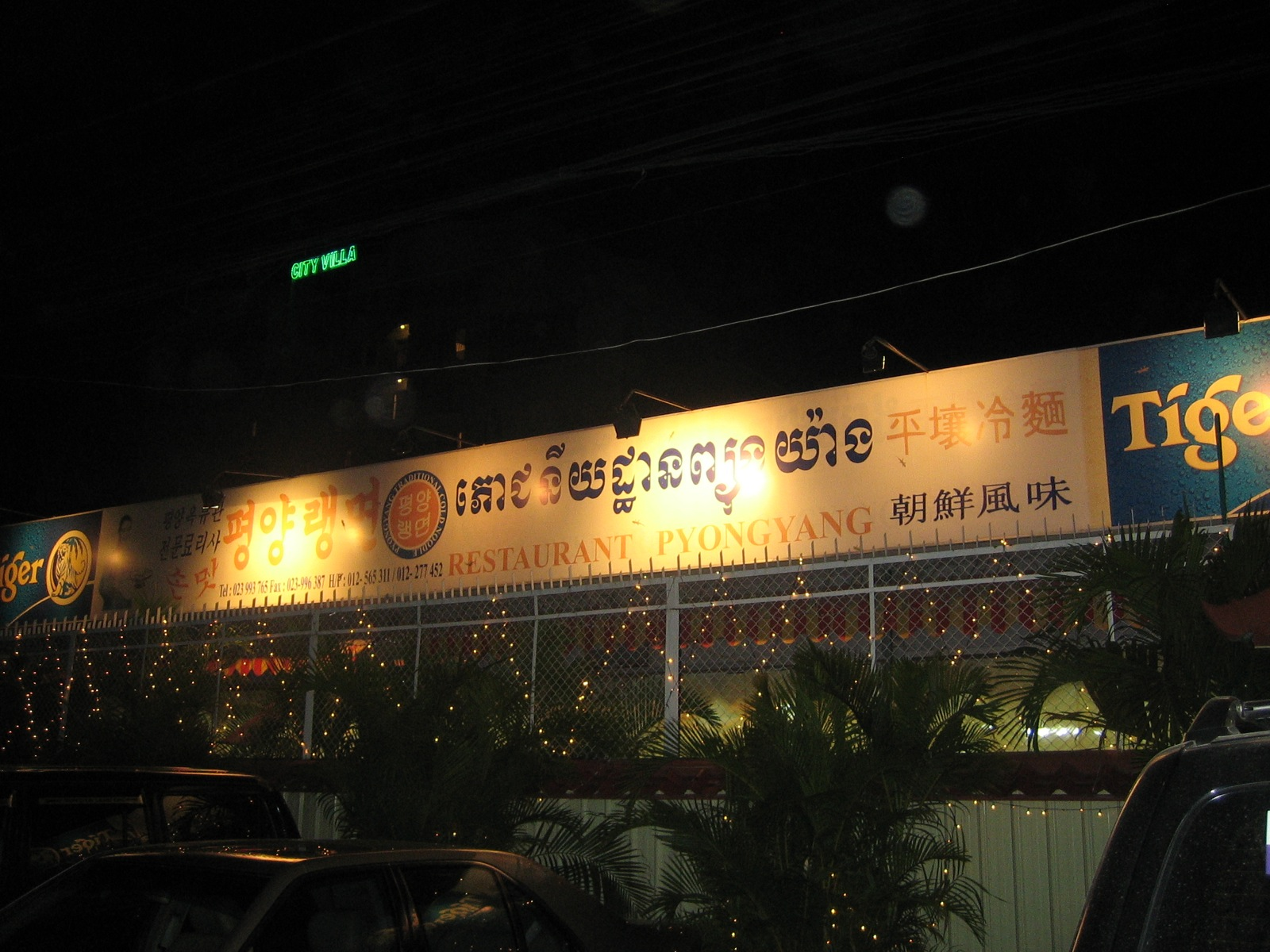
Sign for Pyongyang in Phnom Penh, Cambodia

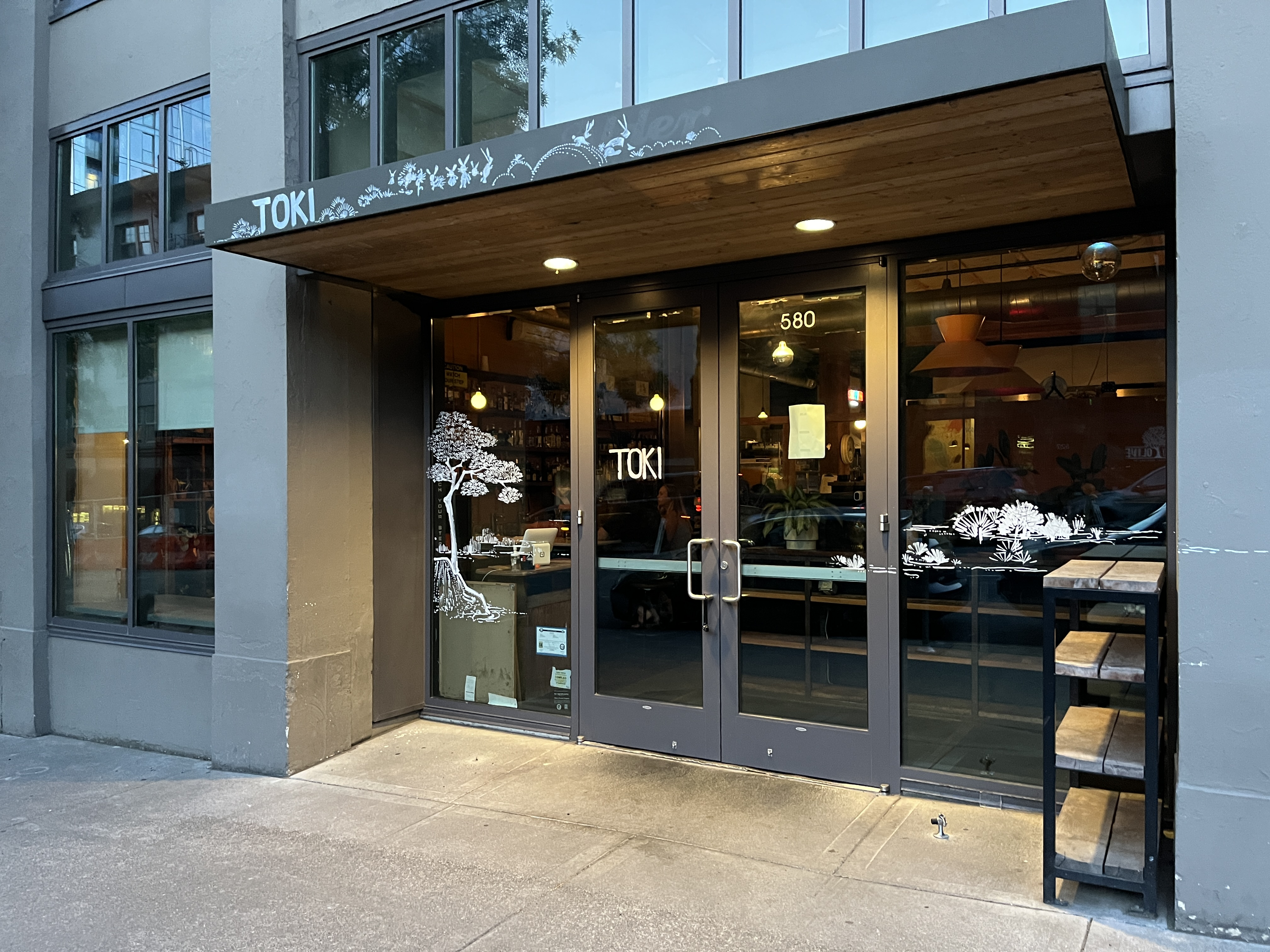
Toki, Portland, Oregon

This is a list of restaurants known for serving Korean cuisine.

== In Korea ==
- Hyodo Chicken
- Imun Seolnongtang, Seoul. The oldest restaurant in Korea.
- Kyochon, South Korea
- Mapo Ok, Seoul

== Outside Korea ==
- Saikabo, international

=== United States ===
- Atoboy, New York City
- Atomix, New York City
- Beastro, Portland, Oregon, U.S.
- Bok a Bok
- Bōm, New York City
- Bonchon Chicken, South Korea and United States
- Coqodaq, New York City
- Cote, New York City
- Cupbop, United States and Indonesia
- Danji, New York City
- Du's Grill, Portland and Hillsboro, Oregon
- Frybaby, Portland, Oregon
- Han Oak, Portland, Oregon
- Jeju, Portland, Oregon
- Jeju Noodle Bar, New York City
- Joomak Banjum, New York City
- Joule, Seattle
- Jua, New York City
- Jungsik, New York City
- Kim Jong Grillin', Portland, Oregon
- Kochi, New York City
- Koi Fusion, Oregon
- Mari, New York City
- Maum, Palo Alto, California
- Meju, New York City
- Naro, New York City
- Noori Pocha
- Oiji Mi, New York City
- Okdongsik, New York City
- Paju, Seattle
- Parachute, Chicago
- Pelicana Chicken, South Korea
- Perilla L.A., Los Angeles, California
- Pyongyang, international
- Restaurant Ki
- Revelry, Portland, Oregon
- Saemaeul Restaurant, international
- San Ho Won, San Francisco
- Seoul Sausage
- SMT House, South Korea
- Ssal, San Francisco
- Suki's, Portland, Oregon
- Toki, Portland, Oregon

== See also ==
- List of oldest restaurants in South Korea
