= Kyochon =

South Korean fried chicken restaurant franchise

Kyochon 교촌 橋村
- Type: Private
- Industry: Restaurants
- Founded: 1991; 35 years ago
- Founder: Kwon Won Kang
- Headquarters: Chilgok County, South Korea
- Area served: China, Indonesia, Malaysia, Taiwan, Philippines, South Korea, Thailand, United States, United Arab Emirates
- Products: Fried chicken
- Website: www.kyochon.com www.kyochon.com.my

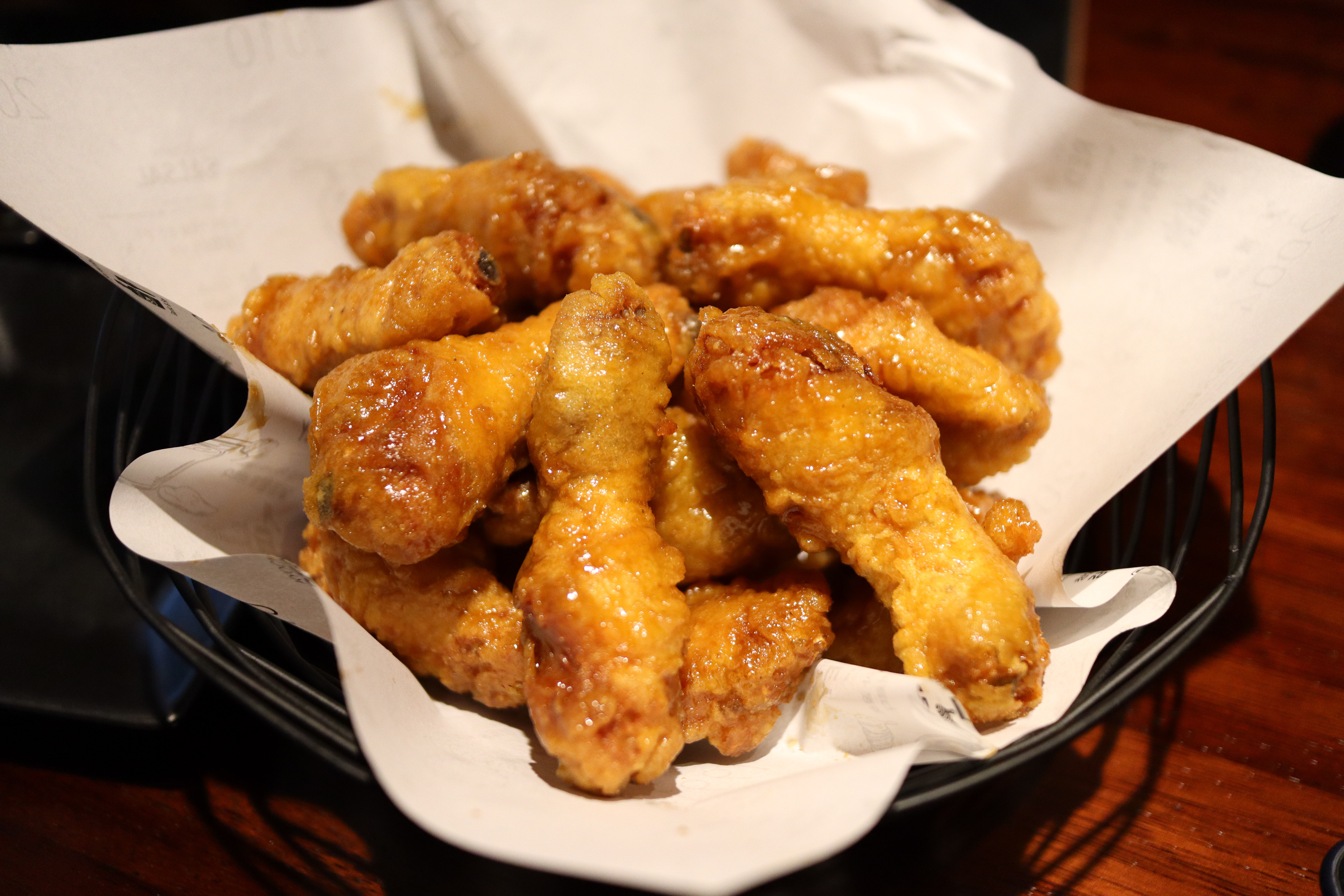
Kyochon Honey Combo Chicken

Kyochon F&B Co., Ltd. (Korean: 교촌; Hanja: 橋村) is a South Korean fried-chicken restaurant chain. Founded in 1991, Kyochon is one of the largest Korean fried-chicken restaurants in South Korea. Kyochon operates some restaurants in the United States as well. Kyochon has its head office in Osan, Gyeongi-do. In 2015, Kyochon opened its world largest outlet in Malaysia at Pavilion KL. Kyochon had over 50 outlets nationwide.

Korean fried chicken franchise Kyochon opened its fifth store in Taiwan, this time with a roadside venue in Taichung, a city known for its bustling night markets and shopping scene, its operator Kyochon F&B said 15 Oct. 2024.

== See also ==
- List of fast-food chicken restaurants
- List of Korean restaurants
