= Maum (restaurant) =

Defunct Korean restaurant in Palo Alto, California, U.S.

- Interactive map of Maum

Restaurant information
- Established: July 2018
- Closed: June 2020
- Owners: Brian and Grace Koo
- Chef: Michael and Meichih Kim
- Food type: Korean
- Rating: 1 Michelin star
- Location: 322 University Avenue, Palo Alto, California, 94301, United States
- Coordinates: 37°26′46.2″N 122°9′40″W
- Seating capacity: 16
- Website: maumpaloalto.com

Maum was a Korean fine dining restaurant in Palo Alto, California. Opened in 2018 after previously operating as a private dining room, it received a Michelin star before closing in 2020 because of the COVID-19 pandemic.

== Restaurant ==
Maum, meaning "from the heart" or "heart and soul" in Korean, was a fine dining restaurant on University Avenue in downtown Palo Alto, California, offering a dinner tasting menu of seasonal Korean cuisine. Diners were seated at a communal table with a maximum capacity of 16. The chefs were the married couple of Michael and Meichih Kim, a Korean American and a Taiwanese American; the wine directors were Rebecca Fineman and Chris Gaither, also a married couple, later succeeded by Jose Maria-Aguirre. A small farm in backyard space in Los Altos Hills grew Korean vegetables for the restaurant.

The dining room was simply decorated by Lundberg Design, with bare concrete walls, pivoting screens at the street end made from the same fir tree as the table, and handmade pottery for decoration.

The Michelin Guide described Maum as an "impossibly chic supper club-turned-nightly dinner party". A reviewer for the San Francisco Chronicle characterized it as "easy to read as a love letter to Los Angeles' Koreatown and Korean cuisine at large, from one peninsula to another, which uses food as poetic references to long-distance yet kindred spirits."

== History ==
Brian Koo, a Korean American venture capitalist, and his wife, Grace, opened Maum as a private dining room in summer 2017. Brian Koo grew up in the Koreatown neighborhood of Los Angeles and felt the relative lack of Korean food after moving to San Francisco. At the urging of friends, Maum opened as a restaurant in July the following year. It was originally envisaged as a restaurant, housed in a former Apple Store elsewhere on University Avenue, but was reduced in scale after a planning application for a rooftop terrace was rejected.

Maum was awarded a Michelin star in June 2019.

During the 2020 restaurant shutdown caused by the COVID-19 pandemic, Maum briefly offered takeout food with outdoor delivery to customers, but the Kims decided that was unsustainable and the communal dining format was not compatible with social distancing. In mid-June 2020, they announced that the restaurant would remain closed and be replaced in July with a retail store for Korean food, including farm boxes and prepared meals, to which an online store called Maum Kitchen selling Korean and other Asian imports would be added in the fall. In August the restaurant and the Kims announced that the chefs had agreed to leave, according to consultant Charles Chen partly on financial grounds. The retail business closed in early September; the Kims subsequently opened a casual dining restaurant in a new food hall and market in Los Altos and then in 2025 a fine dining restaurant in Menlo Park.

== See also ==
- List of defunct restaurants of the United States
- List of Korean restaurants
- List of Michelin-starred restaurants in California
