= Noori Pocha =

Restaurant in Clawson, Michigan, U.S.

- Interactive map of Noori Pocha

Restaurant information
- Food type: Korean
- Location: 1 South Main Street, Clawson, Michigan, 48017, United States
- Coordinates: 42°32′00″N 83°08′45″W
- Website: nooripocha.com

Noori Pocha is a Korean restaurant in Clawson, Michigan. It was included in The New York Times's 2024 list of the 50 best restaurants in the United States. Serena Maria Daniels included the restaurant in Eater Detroit's 2024 list of twelve "superb" restaurants for wings in Metro Detroit.

== See also ==
- List of Korean restaurants
