= Bōm (restaurant) =

Korean restaurant in New York City

- Interactive map of Bōm

Restaurant information
- Established: January 2023
- Head chef: Brian Kim
- Pastry chef: Celia Lee
- Food type: Korean
- Rating: (Michelin Guide)
- Location: 17 West 19th Street, New York City, New York, 10011, United States
- Coordinates: 40°44′22.9″N 73°59′32.9″W
- Website: bom-nyc.com

Bōm is a Korean restaurant in the Flatiron District of Manhattan in New York City. The restaurant has received a Michelin star and is located in the backroom of another Michelin-starred Korean spot, Oiji Mi.

== See also ==
- List of Korean restaurants
- List of Michelin-starred restaurants in New York City
