= Ssal (restaurant) =

Korean restaurant in San Francisco, California, U.S.

- Interactive map of Ssal

Restaurant information
- Head chef: Junsoo Bae
- Food type: California-influenced Korean
- Rating: (Michelin Guide)
- Location: 2226 Polk Street, San Francisco, California, 94109, United States
- Coordinates: 37°47′50.5″N 122°25′19″W
- Reservations: Required
- Website: ssalsf.com

Ssal is a Korean restaurant in San Francisco, California. The restaurant has received a Michelin star.

== See also ==
- List of Korean restaurants
- List of Michelin-starred restaurants in California
