= Suki's =

Bar in Portland, Oregon, U.S.

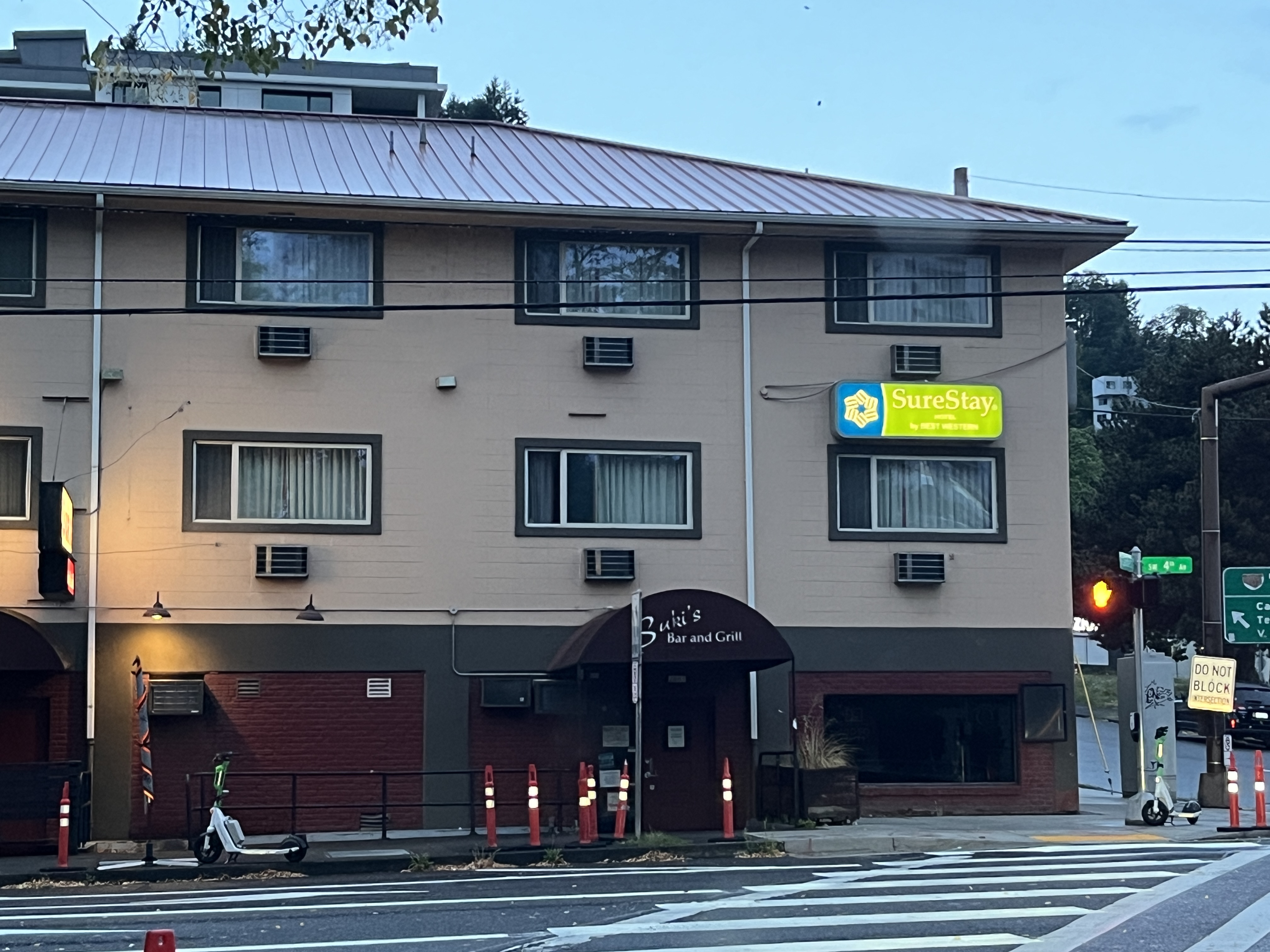
- Exterior of the original location, 2025
- Interactive map of Suki's

Restaurant information
- Food type: Korean fusion
- Location: Portland, Multnomah, Oregon, United States
- Coordinates: 45.5119°N 122.6345°W
- Website: sukisbar.com

Suki's is a bar in Portland, Oregon, United States. The original dive bar in southwest Portland closed in 2025. A second location, which opened on Hawthorne Boulevard in southeast Portland's Richmond neighborhood in 2023, continues to operate.

== Description ==
The original dive bar on Fourth Avenue in southwest Portland closed in 2025 and a second location continues to operate on Hawthorne Boulevard in southeast Portland's Richmond neighborhood. The bars have hosted karaoke and served Korean fusion cuisine. Food options have included bulgogi tacos, teriyaki chicken rice plates, mozzarella sticks, and onion rings.

== History ==
Phil Chung is the owner of Suki's. The original restaurant operated for approximately 29 years.

The remaining location (sometimes called Suki's II) opened on October 19, 2023, in a space that previously housed Claudia's Sports Pub.

Suki's has hosted comedy open mics.

== See also ==
- List of dive bars
- List of Korean restaurants
