= Naro (restaurant) =

Korean restaurant in New York City

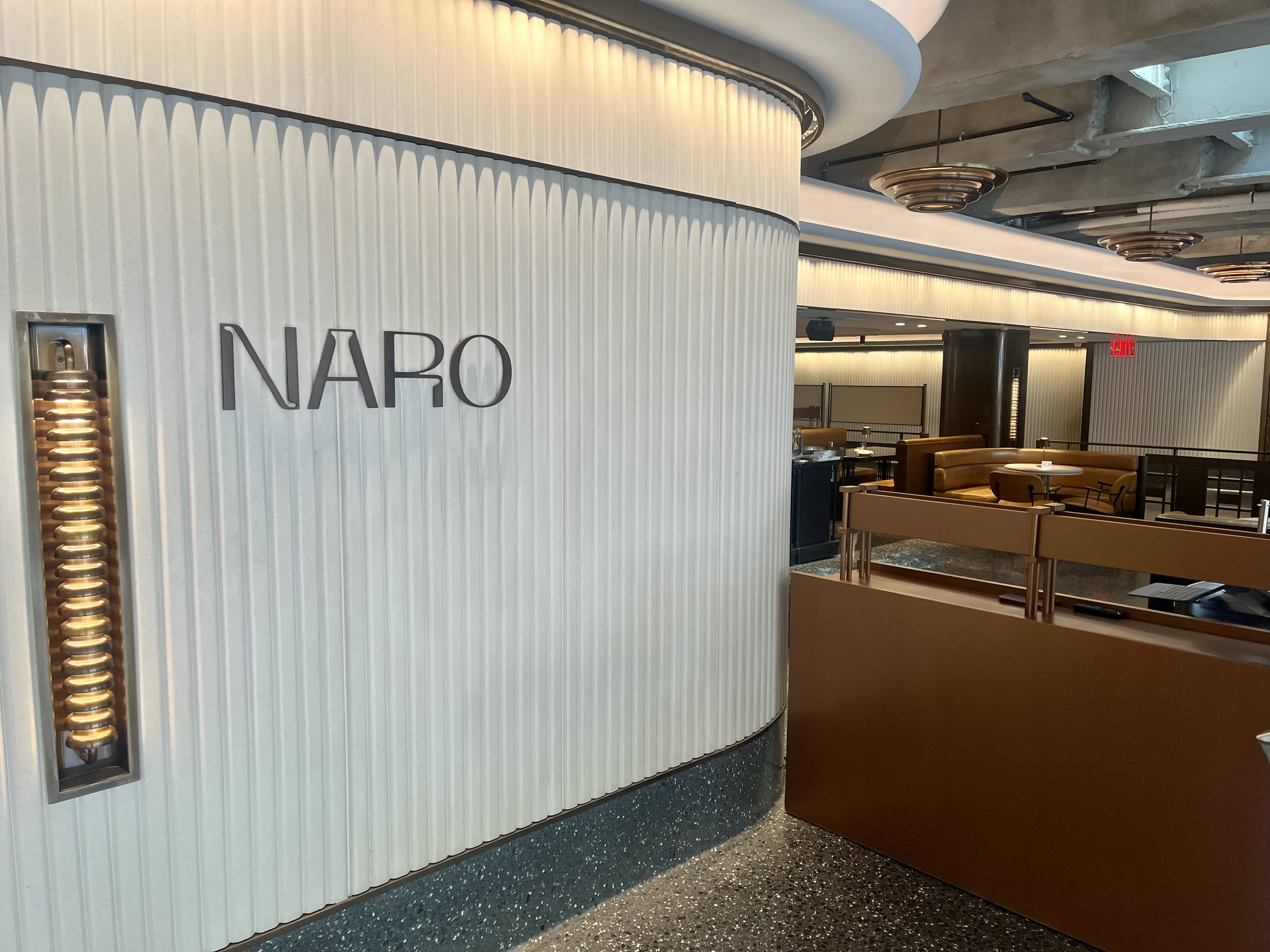
- The restaurant's entrance in 2024
- Interactive map of Naro

Restaurant information
- Established: 2022
- Food type: Korean
- Location: 610 Fifth Avenue, New York City, New York, 10020, United States
- Coordinates: 40°45′30″N 73°58′43″W

Naro is a Korean restaurant in New York City.

== History ==
The restaurant opened in 2022 and is located in the underground concourse of Rockefeller Center.

== Reception ==
The New York Times included Naro in a list of the city's twelve best new restaurants in 2023.

== See also ==
- List of Korean restaurants
