= Joomak Banjum =

Korean restaurant in New York City

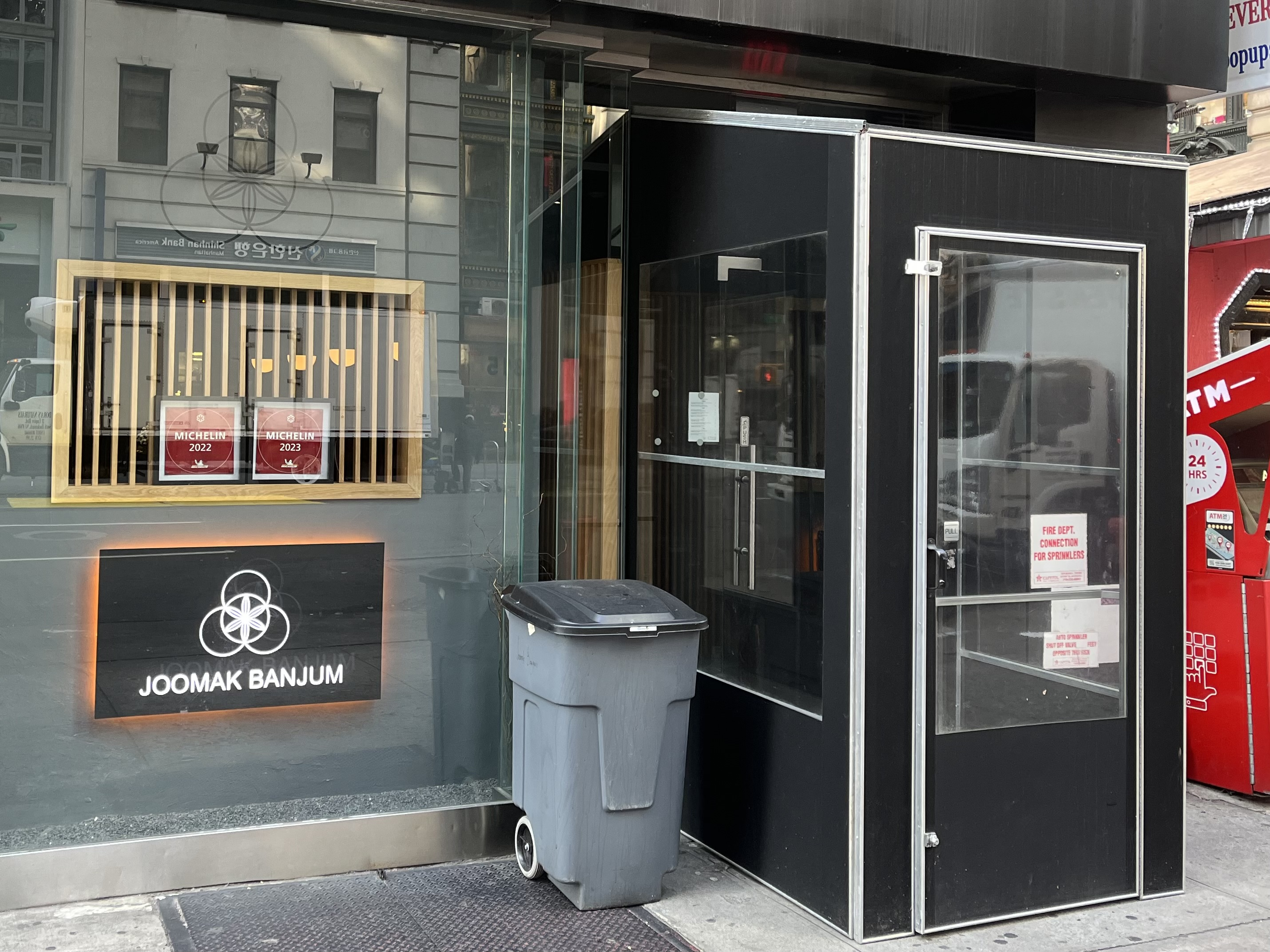
- Joomak Banjum in November 2023
- Interactive map of Joomak Banjum

Restaurant information
- Established: June 23, 2021
- Closed: February 18, 2024
- Previous owners: Jiho Kim and Sarah Kang
- Food type: Korean
- Location: 312 Fifth Avenue, New York City, New York, 10001, United States
- Coordinates: 40°44′49.5″N 73°59′9.2″W

Joomak Banjum was a Korean restaurant in New York City. Eater New York has described Joomak Banjum as "a modern Korean spot with occasional Chinese flair". The restaurant had received a Michelin star. The restaurant closed on February 18, 2024, due to “skyrocketing” rent increases with one of the former owner Sarah Kang opening up a "Korean Royal Court Cuisine" restaurant called Beut in the same space and Jiho Kim looking for another space to open a "2.0" version of the restaurant.

== See also ==
- List of defunct restaurants of the United States
- List of Korean restaurants
- List of Michelin-starred restaurants in New York City
