= Eunji Lee =

South Korean and French pastry chef

- Born: Busan, South Korea
- Culinary career
- Current restaurant
- Lysée Bakery
- Awardss
- The World's 50 Best Restaurants North America's Best Pastry Chef (2026); James Beard Award Semifinalist (2026); James Beard Award Semifinalist (2024); Food and Wine Best New Chef (2023)

Eunji Lee (Korean: 이은지) is a South Korean and French pastry chef based in New York. She is best known for her work running the Lysée Bakery, which she created and has headed since 2022. She is a two-time James Beard Award semifinalist and was named a Best New Chef by Food and Wine in 2023 and North America's Best Pastry Chef by The World's 50 Best Restaurants in 2026.

== Biography ==
Lee was born and raised in Busan to two artist parents. At 14, she watched a show about making pastries and decided to become a pastry chef. At 18, she wrote in her notebook that she wanted to create an "edible gallery".

At 19, she moved to France and studied at the Institut National de la Boulangerie Patisserie in Rouen and the École Grégoire-Ferrandi in Paris. She worked at Ze Kitchen Gallery and Le Meurice, in the latter location becoming the head of the pastry chefs. In 2016, she became Executive Pastry Chef of Jungsik, and moved to New York. Her tenure was described as "celebrated" and resulted in the restaurant's signature dessert, a fake banana and a dessert tasting menu. In 2017, she participated in a pastry chef show in France, where she was the first-ever non-European finalist.

In 2022, she opened Lysée, which she described as a food "boutique". It was backed by Korean-focused restaurant group Hand Hospitality. The pastries she makes there are described by her as inspired by her Korean and French heritage and New York residence. The "dessert gallery" is capable of accommodating 15 people in the dine-in lower level, and features museum-like glass cases of desserts in the take-out focused upper level. It includes Korean materials in its construction. She launched a wine pairing menu in 2023, described as unique by Vogue, and launched a ten-course dessert tasting menu in 2026.

In 2024, she collaborated with Botanist, a restaurant in British Columbia, for a six-course half-and-half tasting menu.

Her style of desserts is considered trompe l'oeil. She is known for her soy sauce caramel sesame cookies, a rice mousse and praline dish her restaurant was named after, and her realistic corn desserts, which have been described by Eater as one of the first examples of the viral corn dessert trend and which she first created in 2017. She has stated she's frequently inspired by art and views her works as edible art.

She was named a Best New Chef by Food and Wine in 2023, was named a semifinalist for the James Beard Award for Outstanding Pastry Chef in 2024 and 2026, and was named North America's Best Pastry Chef of 2026.

== Personal life ==
Her husband is Matthieu Lobry, a fellow chef. They met while working at Le Maurice.
