= Mari (restaurant) =

Korean restaurant in New York City

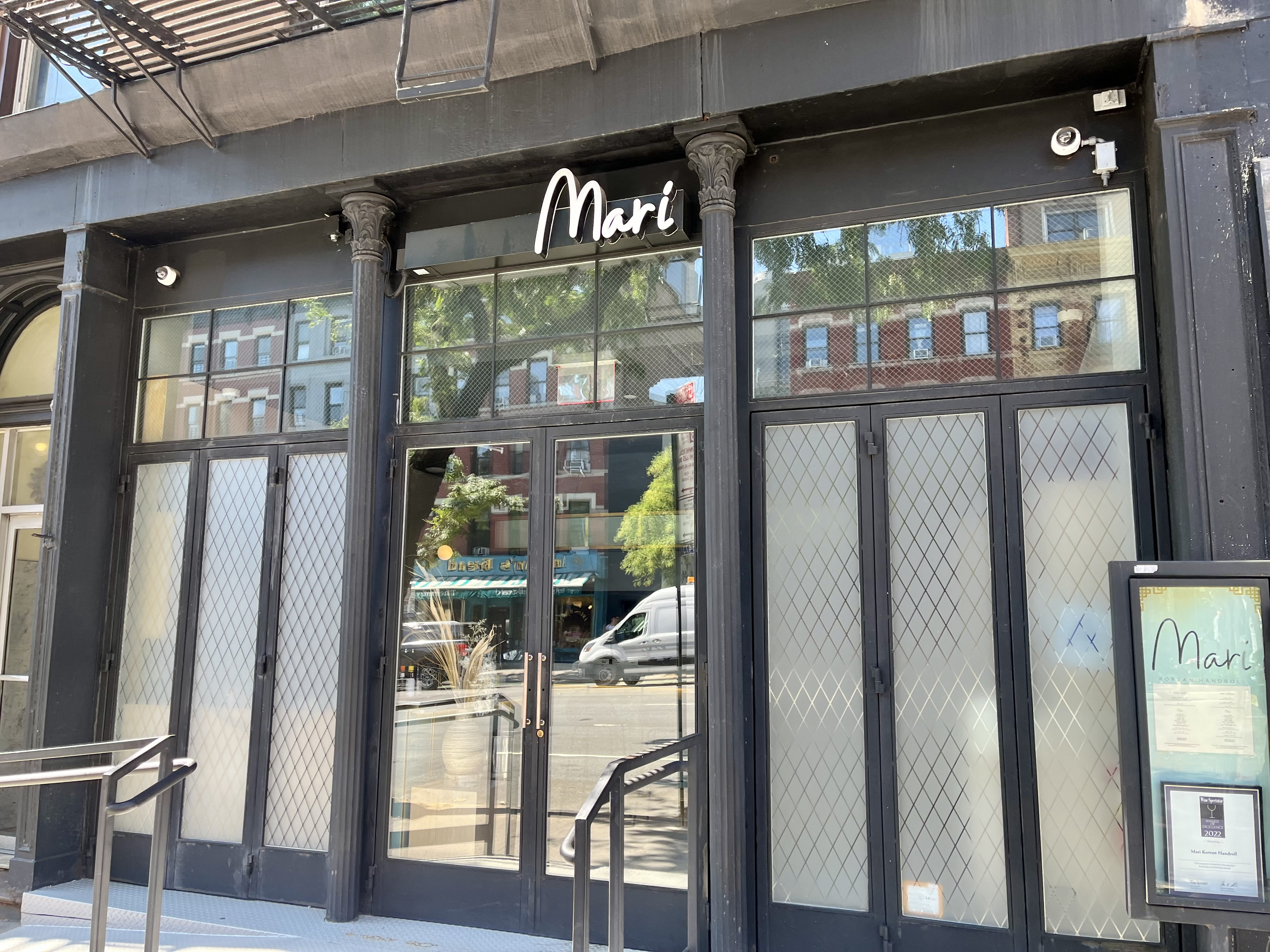
- Mari in August 2023
- Interactive map of Mari

Restaurant information
- Established: December 10, 2021
- Food type: Korean
- Rating: (Michelin Guide)
- Location: 679 Ninth Avenue, New York City, New York, 10036, United States
- Coordinates: 40°45′41.6″N 73°59′26.2″W

Mari is a Korean restaurant in New York City. The restaurant has received a Michelin star. Time Out New York has rated Mari 5 out of 5 stars.

== See also ==
- List of Korean restaurants
- List of Michelin-starred restaurants in New York City
