= Bok a Bok =

Defunct Korean fried chicken chain in the United States

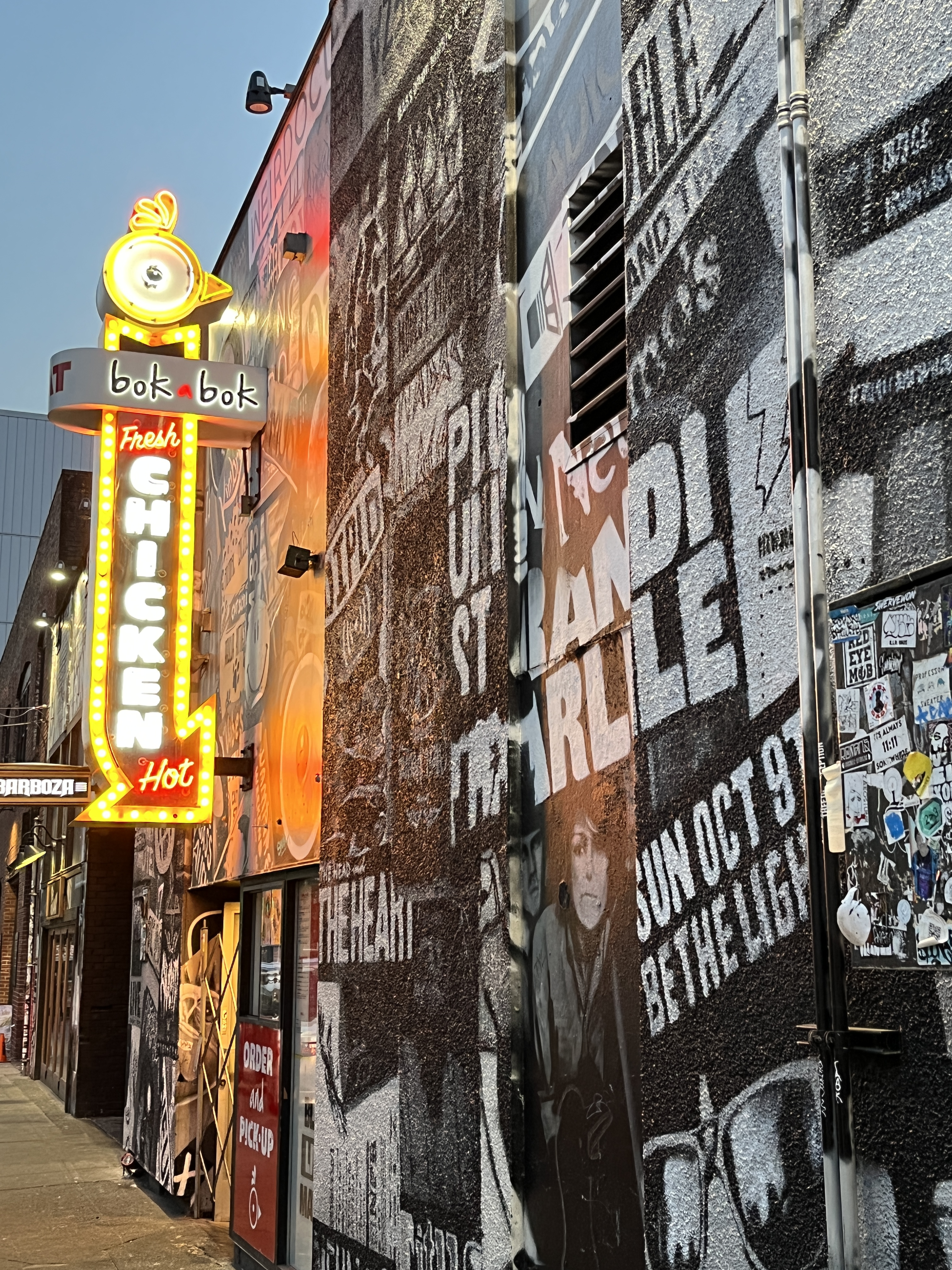
- Exterior of the restaurant on Capitol Hill, Seattle, 2022

Restaurant information
- Location: Washington, United States

Bok a Bok Fried Chicken, or simply Bok a Bok, was a restaurant chain in the U.S. state of Washington.

== Description ==
The business specialized in Korean-style fried chicken; the menu also included chicken sandwiches (including one with yuzu aioli and charred chiles), kimchi mac and cheese, and tots with Chile salt.

== History ==
The business started in White Center and later expanded to Burien, the University District, Capitol Hill, and Kirkland. By July 2025, only the Capitol Hill location remained in business. The restaurant subsequently closed after sustaining substantial damage, and owner Brian O’Connor later announced that it would not reopen.

== See also ==
- Fried chicken restaurant
- List of defunct restaurants of the United States
- List of Diners, Drive-Ins and Dives episodes
- List of Korean restaurants
- List of restaurant chains in the United States
