= Oiji Mi =

Korean restaurant in New York City

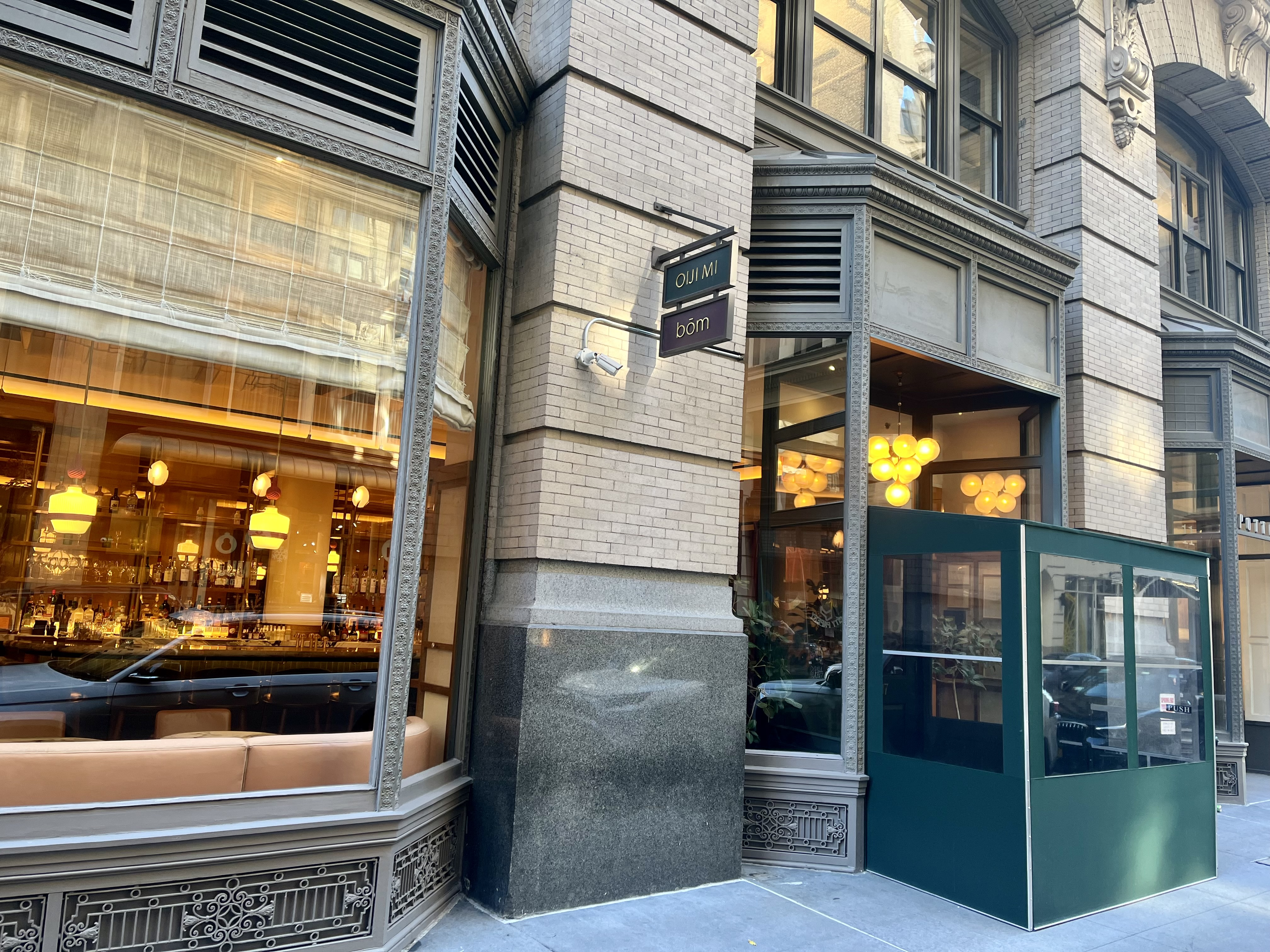
- Oiji Mi in November 2023
- Interactive map of Oiji Mi

Restaurant information
- Established: May 10, 2022
- Food type: Korean
- Rating: (Michelin Guide)
- Location: 17 West 19th Street, New York City, New York, 10011, United States
- Coordinates: 40°44′23″N 73°59′33″W
- Website: Official website

Oiji Mi is a Korean restaurant in the Flatiron District of Manhattan in New York City. The restaurant has received a Michelin star, and has another Michelin-starred restaurant located through the backdoor, Bōm.

== See also ==
- List of Korean restaurants
- List of Michelin-starred restaurants in New York City
