= Perilla L.A. =

Korean restaurant in Los Angeles, California, U.S.

- Interactive map of Perilla L.A.

Restaurant information
- Established: July 2023
- Location: 1027 Alpine Street, Los Angeles, California, 90012, United States
- Coordinates: 34°3′56.6″N 118°14′49″W
- Website: perillala.com

Perilla L.A., or simply Perilla, is a Korean restaurant in Los Angeles, California. Established in July 2023, the business was included in The New York Times's 2023 list of the 50 best restaurants in the United States.

== See also ==
- List of Korean restaurants
