= Jua (restaurant) =

Korean restaurant in New York City

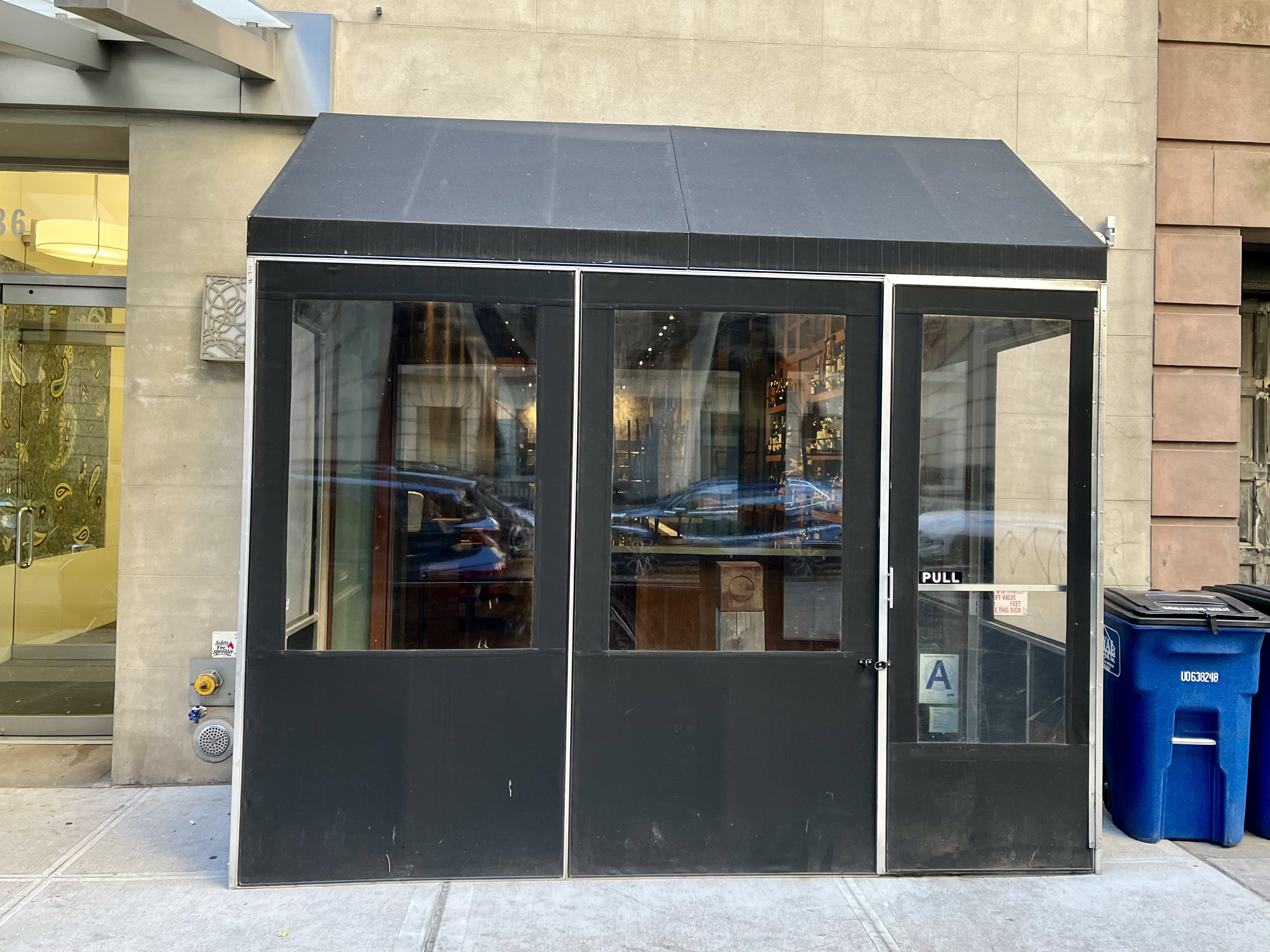
- Jua in November 2023
- Interactive map of Jua

Restaurant information
- Established: 2020
- Food type: Korean
- Rating: Michelin Guide
- Location: 36 East 22nd Street, New York, New York, 10010
- Coordinates: 40°44′23.5″N 73°59′16″W
- Website: juanyc.com

Jua is a Korean restaurant in the Flatiron District of Manhattan in New York City. The restaurant has received a Michelin star.

== See also ==
- List of Korean restaurants
- List of Michelin-starred restaurants in New York City
