= Jeju (restaurant) =

Korean restaurant in Portland, Oregon, U.S.

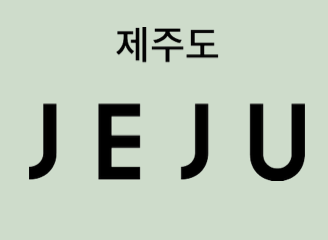
- Interactive map of Jeju

Restaurant information
- Established: 2023
- Owners: Peter Cho; Sun Young Park
- Food type: Korean
- Location: Portland, Multnomah, Oregon, United States
- Coordinates: 45.5136°N 122.6592°W
- Website: jejupdx.com

Jeju (Korean: 제주도; lit. 'Jeju Island') is a Korean restaurant in Portland, Oregon, United States.

== Description ==
The Korean restaurant Jeju operates in southeast Portland. It is named for Jeju Island in South Korea, where founder Peter Cho's family is from. It has multiple event spaces, hosts karaoke, and plays hip hop and K-pop. The interior features high wooden ceilings. The menu includes Korean barbecue and cocktails. Michael Russell of The Oregonian has described Jeju as a "sustainability minded" Korean steakhouse.

== History ==
Spouses Peter Cho and Sun Young Park opened Jeju in 2023, in the space that previously housed Renata. Ben Klein is the chef.

== Reception ==
Michael Russell ranked Jeju second in The Oregonian's list of Portland's ten best new restaurants of 2023. He also included the fish sauce wings in the newspaper's list of Portland's ten best dishes of 2024, and included Jeju in a 2025 list of the 21 best restaurants in southeast Portland. Russell included the French fries in The Oregonian's list of Portland's 25 best dishes of 2025.

Jeju was included in The Infatuation's 2024 list of Portland's best restaurants. Katherine Chew Hamilton and Brooke Jackson-Glidden included Jeju in Eater Portland's 2025 list of the city's best restaurants and food cart pods for large groups.

== See also ==
- History of Korean Americans in Portland, Oregon
- List of Korean restaurants
- List of steakhouses
