= Jungsik =

Korean fine dining restaurant chain

Jungsik (New York City location)
- Interactive map of Jungsik (New York City location)

Restaurant information
- Established: September 2011
- Head chef: Jungsik Yim
- Chef: Daeik Kim
- Pastry chef: Eunchong Kim
- Food type: Korean
- Rating: New York (Michelin Guide); Seoul (Michelin Guide)
- Location: 2 Harrison Street, New York City, New York, 10013, United States
- Coordinates: 40°43′7.8″N 74°0′32.7″W
- Website: Official website

Jungsik (Korean: 정식당; RR: Jeongsikdang) is a fine dining restaurant brand, with locations in Seoul and New York City. The restaurants serve Korean cuisine. The New York City location received 3 Michelin stars in 2024, becoming the first Korean restaurant outside of South Korea to earn this accolade. The restaurant also became the first new 3-star restaurant in New York City since 2012.

The restaurant first opened in Seoul in 2009. It opened its New York City location in 2012. Its head chef and owner is Jungsik Yim. Its New York City location received its first Michelin star in 2013. Its Seoul location received one Michelin star in 2017 (the first year the guide was offered), and received two Michelin stars from 2018 to 2023. Chef Eunji Lee served as its head pastry chef.

== See also ==
- List of Korean restaurants
- List of Michelin-starred restaurants in New York City
- List of Michelin-starred restaurants in South Korea
- List of Michelin 3-star restaurants in the United States
