= Benu (restaurant) =

- Interactive map of Benu

Restaurant information
- Established: 2010; 16 years ago
- Head chef: Corey Lee
- Food type: Asian-inspired New American
- Rating: (Michelin Guide); AAA Five Diamond Award (2012-2025)
- Location: 22 Hawthorne Street, San Francisco, California, 94105, United States
- Coordinates: 37.785407°N 122.399112°W
- Website: www.benusf.com

Benu is the first restaurant in San Francisco to have received three Michelin stars. Located in the SoMa district, Benu was opened in 2010 by chef Corey Lee, the former Chef de Cuisine at the French Laundry.

In 2019, Benu made its debut on The World's 50 Best Restaurants, and in 2024 celebrated ten consecutive years of three stars.

== Restaurant ==
Corey Lee was born in Seoul, South Korea and moved to the United States at age five. Prior to opening Benu, he was the head chef at The French Laundry, working for Thomas Keller at both The French Laundry and Per Se for a total of nine years.

At Benu, he serves a set tasting menu that features a wide variety of seafood and vegetables, a few meat courses, and some sweets. Lee draws from many different cuisines, including Korean and Cantonese. He states that “Benu is open to the influence of all different kinds of cultures. We have Asian influences, of course. We have Western influences. We have influences that are technique-driven. Some are flavor-driven. Some are ingredient-driven. But it accepts all those things and it defines the kind of food we serve.”

In addition to the tasting menu, Benu offers an optional beverage pairing that includes beer, wine, and sake.

Benu is housed on the ground floor of a historic building that dates back to 1922–originally the headquarters of the San Francisco Newspaper Company. Crown Point Press, an art studio, gallery, and bookstore, now owns the building and resides directly above the restaurant.

In 2015, Phaidon published Benu–a collection of recipes and essays that explores the restaurant's food, influences, and collaborators–with forewords by Thomas Keller and David Chang, designed by Julia Hasting.

== Awards and honors ==
- Three Michelin Stars
- Ten Years of Three Michelin Stars, 2024
- Best Chef: West, James Beard Foundation, 2017
- Outstanding Wine Program, James Beard Foundation, 2019
- Eater 38 Icon (Named one of America's 38 Essential Restaurants for five consecutive times)
- Entered the list of The World's 50 Best Restaurants, 2019
- Ranked 28th in The World's 50 Best Restaurants, 2021
- The 40 Most Important Restaurants of the Decade, Esquire
- The Most Important Restaurants of the Decade, Food & Wine
- 5 Stars, Forbes Travel Guide
- 4 Stars, San Francisco Chronicle
- Five Diamond Award, AAA

== Gallery ==
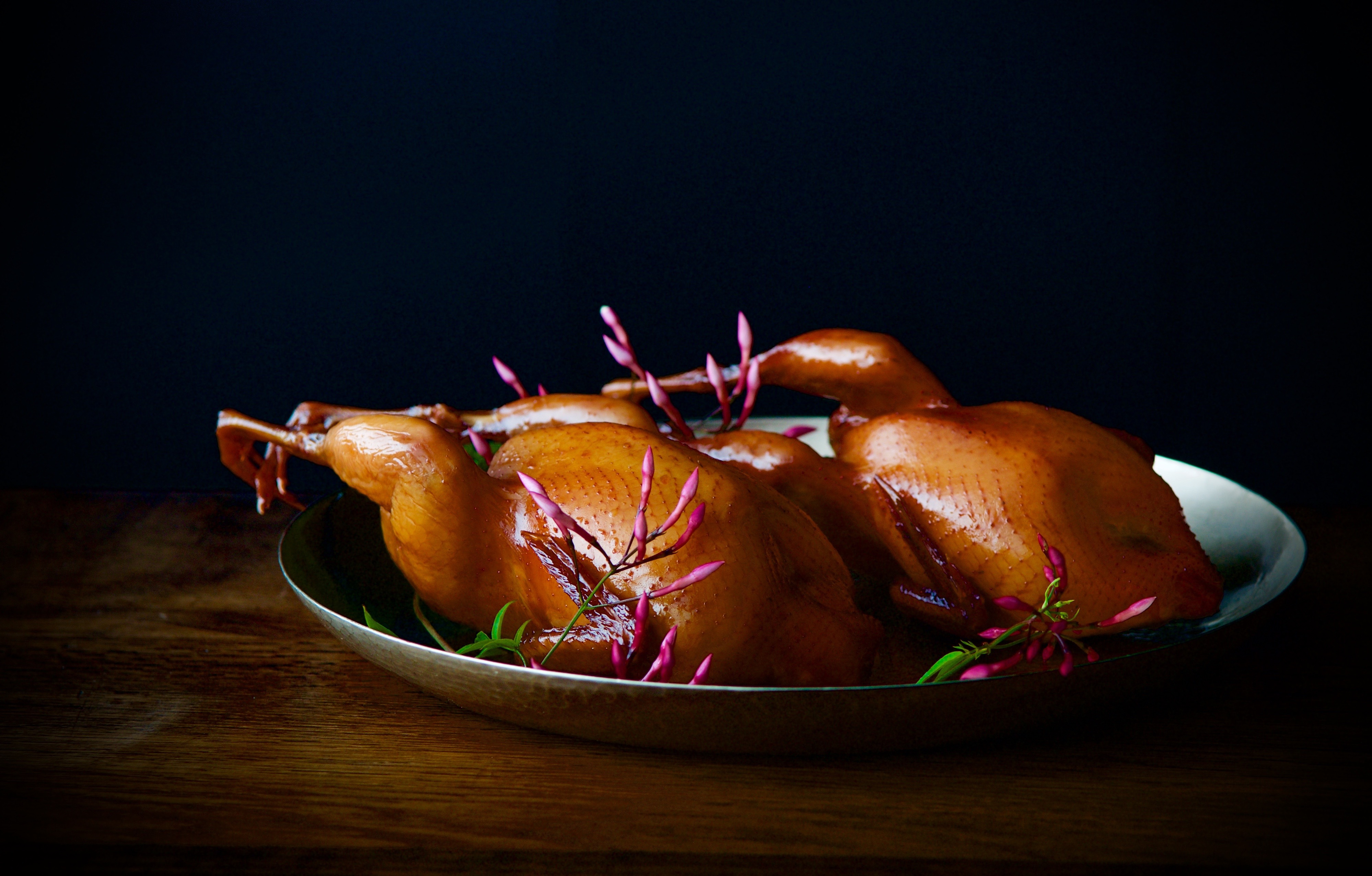
barbecued quail

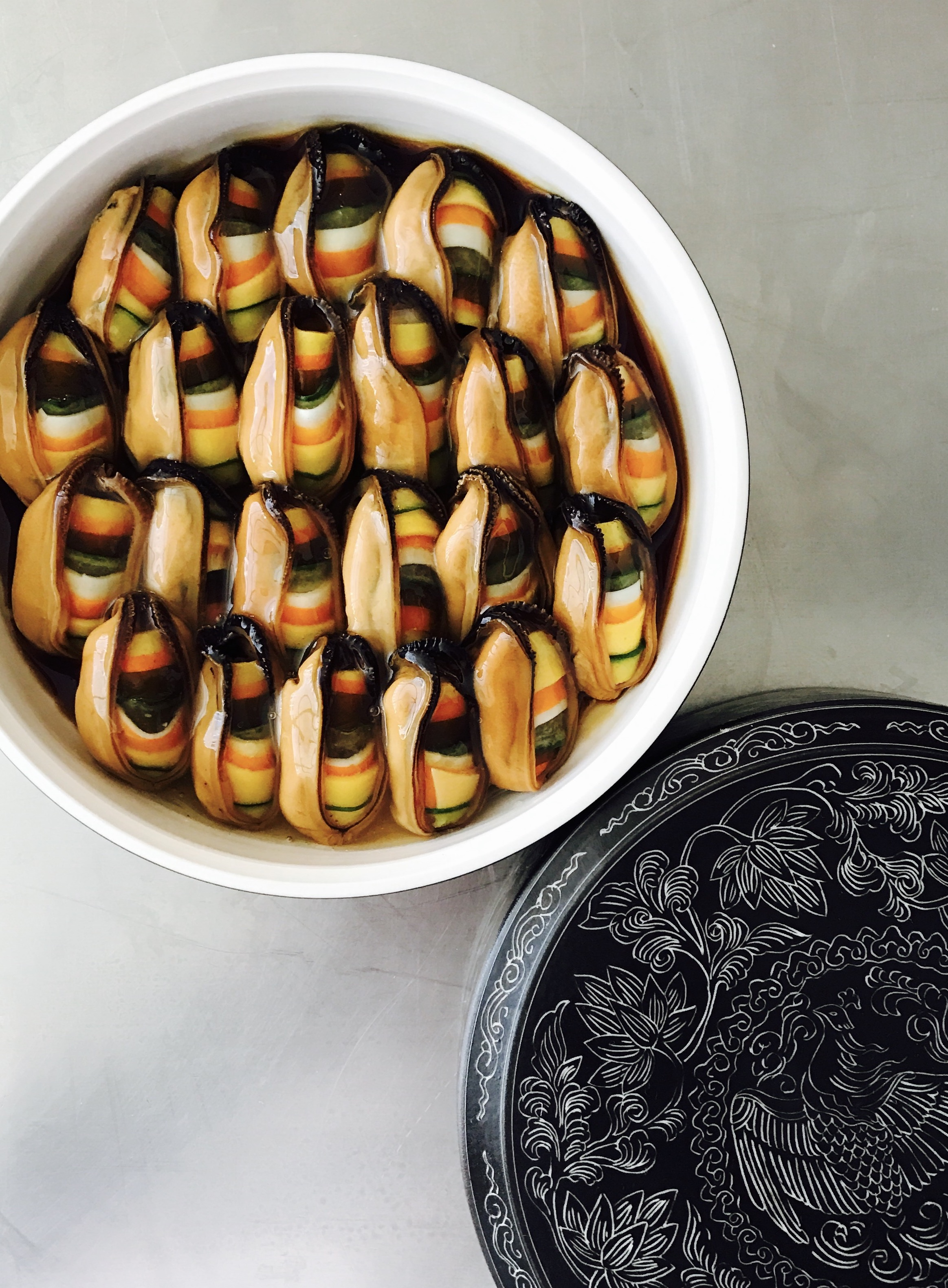
mussels stuffed with glass noodles and fine vegetables

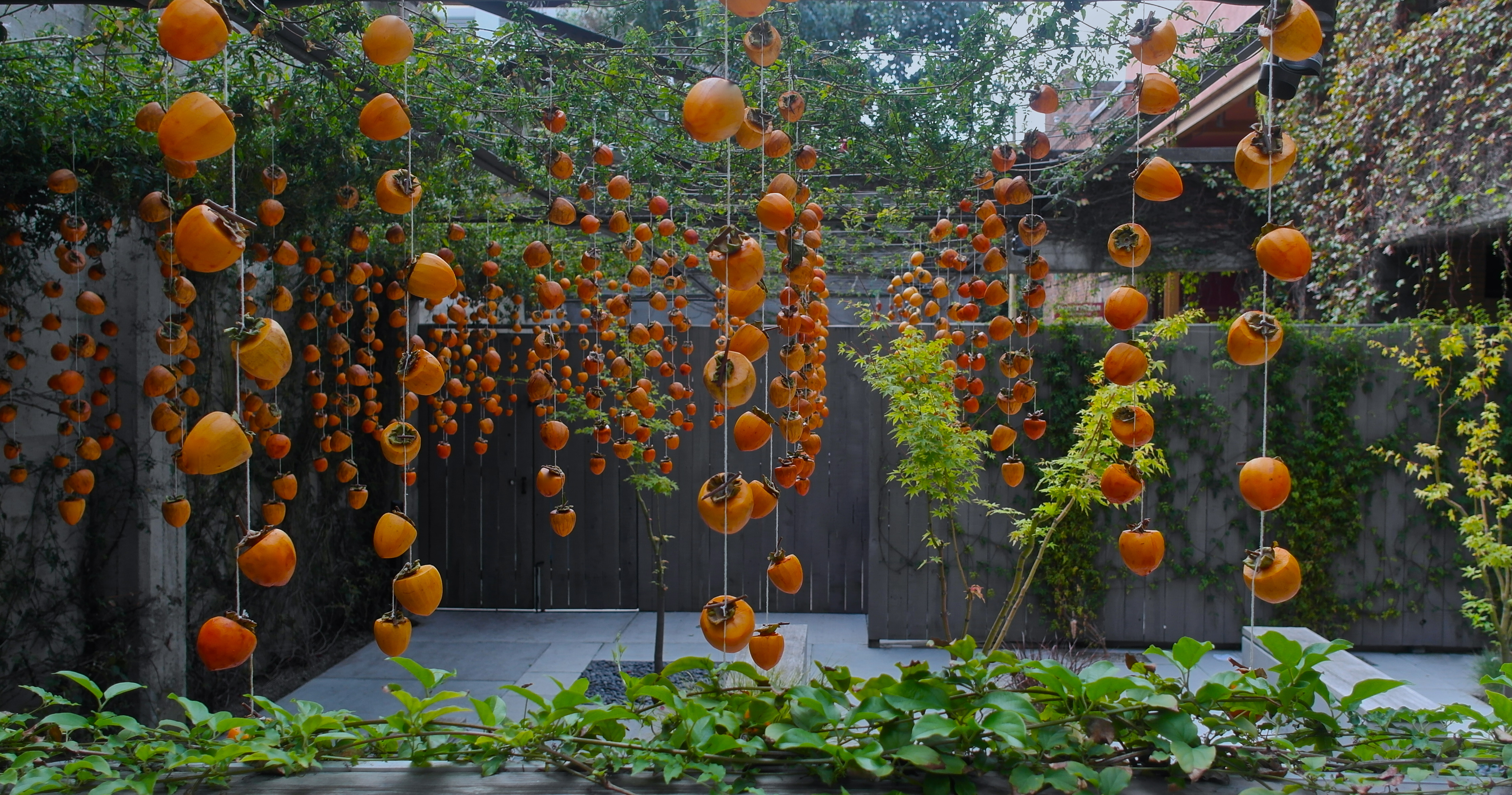
hoshigaki

== See also ==
- List of Michelin 3-star restaurants
- List of Michelin 3-star restaurants in the United States
- List of Michelin-starred restaurants in California
- List of New American restaurants
