= Julia Hasting =

German graphic designer (born 1970)

- Born: July 10, 1970 (age 56); Bremen, West Germany
- Occupation: Creative Director at Phaidon Press
- Known for: Book design
- Website: www.juliahasting.com

Julia Hasting (born 1970) is a German graphic designer. She is the Creative Director of Phaidon Press, head of the design department. She is known for the many best-selling books she designed such as Andy Warhol Catalogue Raisonné, magnumº, A Day at elBulli, and Bruce Nauman: the True Artist.

== Early life ==
Julia Hasting was born in Bremen, West Germany. She attended the Kunsthochschule Kassel, where she and a group of fellow first-year students joined the advanced design class of the poster designer Gunter Rambow. (Note: Rambow's website is here.) A year later, Rambow took on a position at the newly founded Karlsruhe University of Arts and Design, and picked a number of students to apply to the school and make the move with him. As a student Hasting was already working with commercial clients. She founded her design practice in 1997, designing corporate identities, posters and books for cultural clients such as FSB Doorhandles, ZKM - Centre for Art and Media, Karlsruhe, and the European Film Institute.

== International career ==
In 1998 Hasting came to London to meet Phaidon Press's art director Alan Fletcher. She took on the commission to design Cream: an exhibition in a book, and introduced a completely new approach to book design. The publisher spotted the potential and hired Hasting to design more books for Phaidon. Her outlook, and design methods has shaped to great extent Phaidon’s product strategy, setting a new standard in the art publication industry.

In 2000 Hasting moved to New York City to become an art director and lead the new design department for Phaidon Press Inc, NYC. She became active in New York design, commissioning local designers, giving public talks and joining juries in local design competitions. During her time in New York, Hasting produced award-winning design books such as Blink, The Andy Warhol Catalogue Raisonné, Sample, and the monograph of the American artist Gordon Matta-Clark. During her time as art director, Phaidon became one of the most successful art publishers in the world, and her work gained numerous design awards.

In 2007 she was made the Creative director of Phaidon global, and opened her satellite office in Zürich, Switzerland. Since then she helped creating the Phaidon cookbook program, adopting the same design methods of the art publications, and making it one of the leading cookbook publishers in the world.

Hasting taught publication design at the design faculty of the Cooper Union School of Art in New York from 2001 to 2003. Since 2003 she has been contributing illustration work to The New York Times and The New York Times Magazine. In 2000 she became the youngest member of the AGI.

== Honors and awards ==
- Henri de Toulouse-Lautrec Gold Medal, 7th Triennale, German Poster Museum, Essen (1993)
- Bronze Medal, The nicest books of the world, Leipzig Book fair, Germany (1994)
- The 100 best posters, Berlin, Germany (1993–1995)
- Award ITP International Poster Triennale in Toyama, Japan (1999)
- High Design Quality, German Award for Communikations-Design of the Design-Center Nordrheinwestfalen, Germany (1993–1999)
- Brno Biennale of Graphic Design (1994)
- Certificate of Typographic Excellence, Type Directors Club, New York (1999)
- Design Distinction, I.D. Magazine Design Review (2000)
- 25th Kodak Fotobuchpreis, Stuttgart (2000)
- Distinctive Merit, Art Directors Club, New York (2000)
- First Prize, A–Z Competition, Print magazine (2002)
- Gold Medal, Art Directors Club, New York (2003)
- Golden Bee Award, Moscow (2004)
- Award for Outstanding Design, Graphis Magazine, New York (2005)
- British Book Design and Production Awards, (2014)
- D&AD, (2015)
- Art Directors Club Awards, (2015)
- ADG Laus, (2016)
- D&AD, (2019)

== Selected works ==
- Cream (1998)
- Magnum° (1999)
- 10x10 (1999)
- Fresh Cream (2000)
- The Andy Warhol Catalogue Raisonné (2002)
- Robert Capa (2002)
- Blink (2002)
- Vitamin P (2002)
- Sample (2005)
- Vitamin D (2005)
- Gordon Matta-Clark (2006)
- Vitamin PH (2006)
- Unmonumental (2007)
- Le Corbusier Le Grand (2008)
- A Day at elBulli (2009)
- 10X10/3 (2009)
- The Family Meal (2011)
- Sottsass (2013)
- Bruce Nauman: The True Artist (2013)
- WA: The Essence of Japanese Design (2013)
- Academie X: Lessons in Art + Life (2015)
- Benu (2014).
- Factory: Andy Warhol (2016)
- Bread is Gold (2018)
- The Japanese Garden (2017)
- Japan (2018)
