= Atomix (restaurant) =

Korean restaurant in New York City

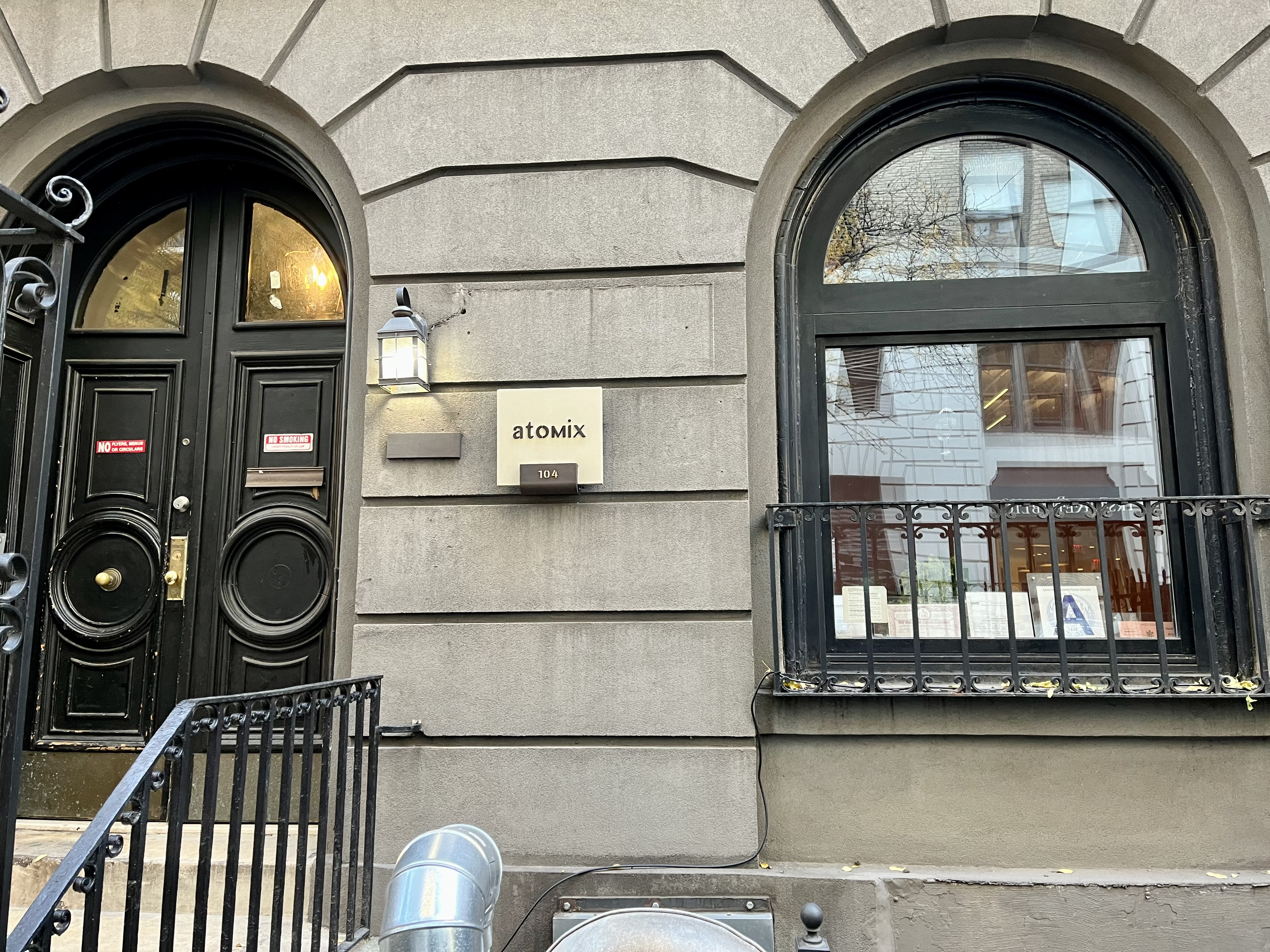
- Atomix in November 2023
- Interactive map of Atomix

Restaurant information
- Established: May 30, 2018
- Owners: NA;EUN Hospitality group
- Manager: Ellia Park
- Head chef: Junghyun Park
- Food type: Korean
- Dress code: Business Casual
- Rating: (Michelin Guide)
- Location: 104 East 30th Street, New York City, New York, 10016, United States
- Coordinates: 40°44′39.5″N 73°58′58.1″W
- Seating capacity: 14 (Chef's Counter downstairs,) 6 (Bar upstairs)
- Reservations: Required
- Website: atomixnyc.com

Atomix is a Korean fine dining restaurant in NoMad, New York City. The restaurant consists of two floors; the main "Chef's Counter" downstairs and the bar upstairs each with their own separate prix-fixe menus with both being reservation only. Along with the Atomix, the same group NA-EUN/나은 Hospitality also runs the sister restaurant Atoboy along with Naro and Seoul Salon. The restaurant is known for its particularly difficult reservations among other NYC restaurants.

== Awards and accolades ==
Atomix was awarded 2 Michelin Stars in 2021.

In 2023, Atomix was named number 8 on the list of The World's 50 Best Restaurants in 2023. That same year, the restaurant's Chef Junghyun "JP" Park won the James Beard Award for New York State's best chef.

In his 2024 ranking of the best 100 restaurants in New York City, The New York Times' restaurant critic Pete Wells placed Atomix fourth.

In 2025, Atomix placed first on the list of North America's 50 Best Restaurants, an offshoot of the list of The World's 50 Best Restaurants.

== See also ==
- List of Korean restaurants
- List of Michelin-starred restaurants in New York City
