= Du's Grill =

Restaurant in the Portland metropolitan area, Oregon, U.S.

Coordinates: 45.5411°N 122.6078°W

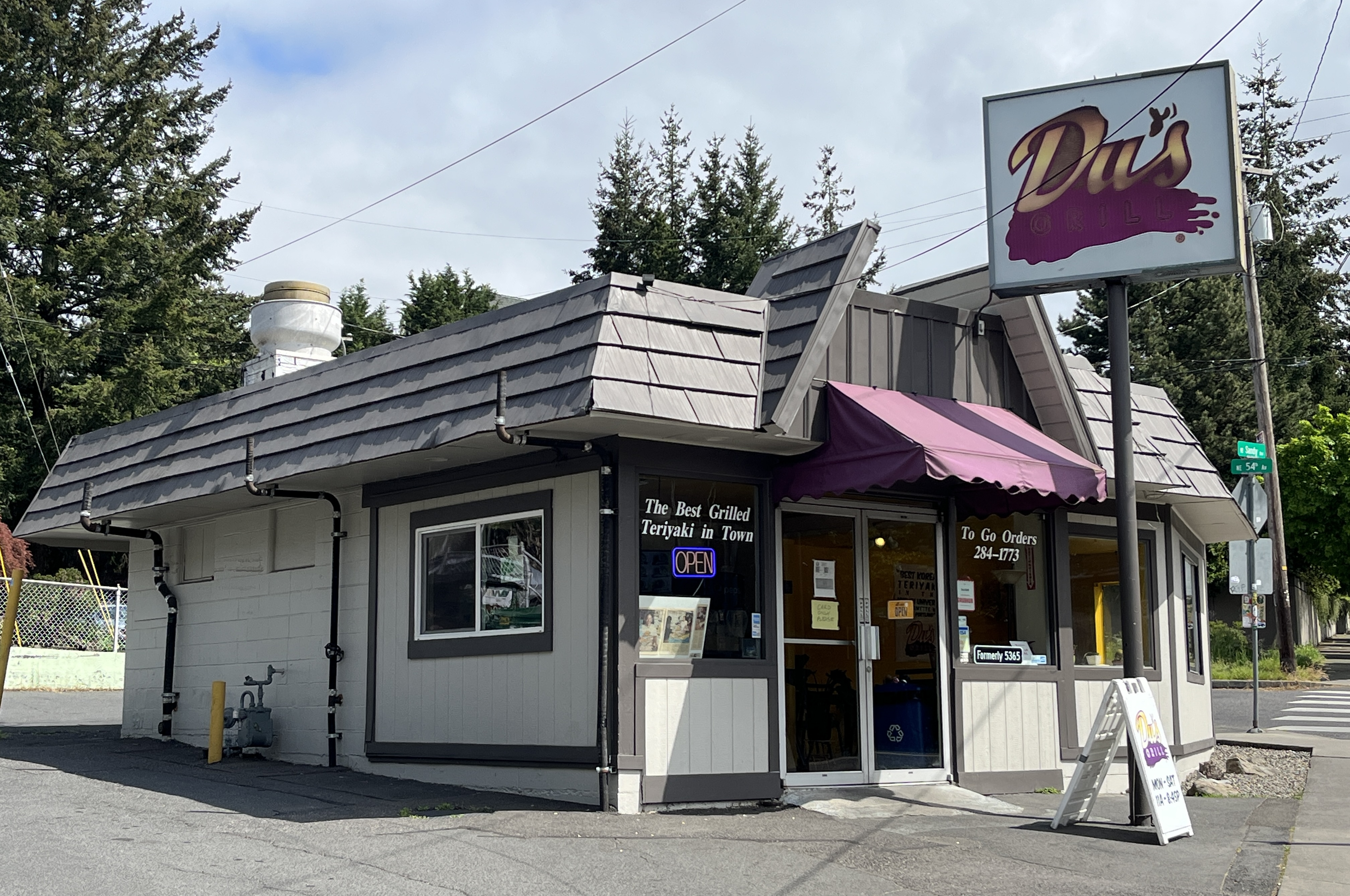
- The restaurant's exterior, 2025
- Interactive map of Du's Grill

Restaurant information
- Owner: Anthony Park
- Previous owners: Bae Park; Muncha Park
- Food type: Korean
- Location: Portland; Hillsboro, Oregon, United States

Du's Grill is a restaurant with two locations in the Portland metropolitan area, in the U.S. state of Oregon. The original restaurant operates in Portland and an outpost called Du's Grill Westside opened in Hillsboro in 2018.

== Description ==
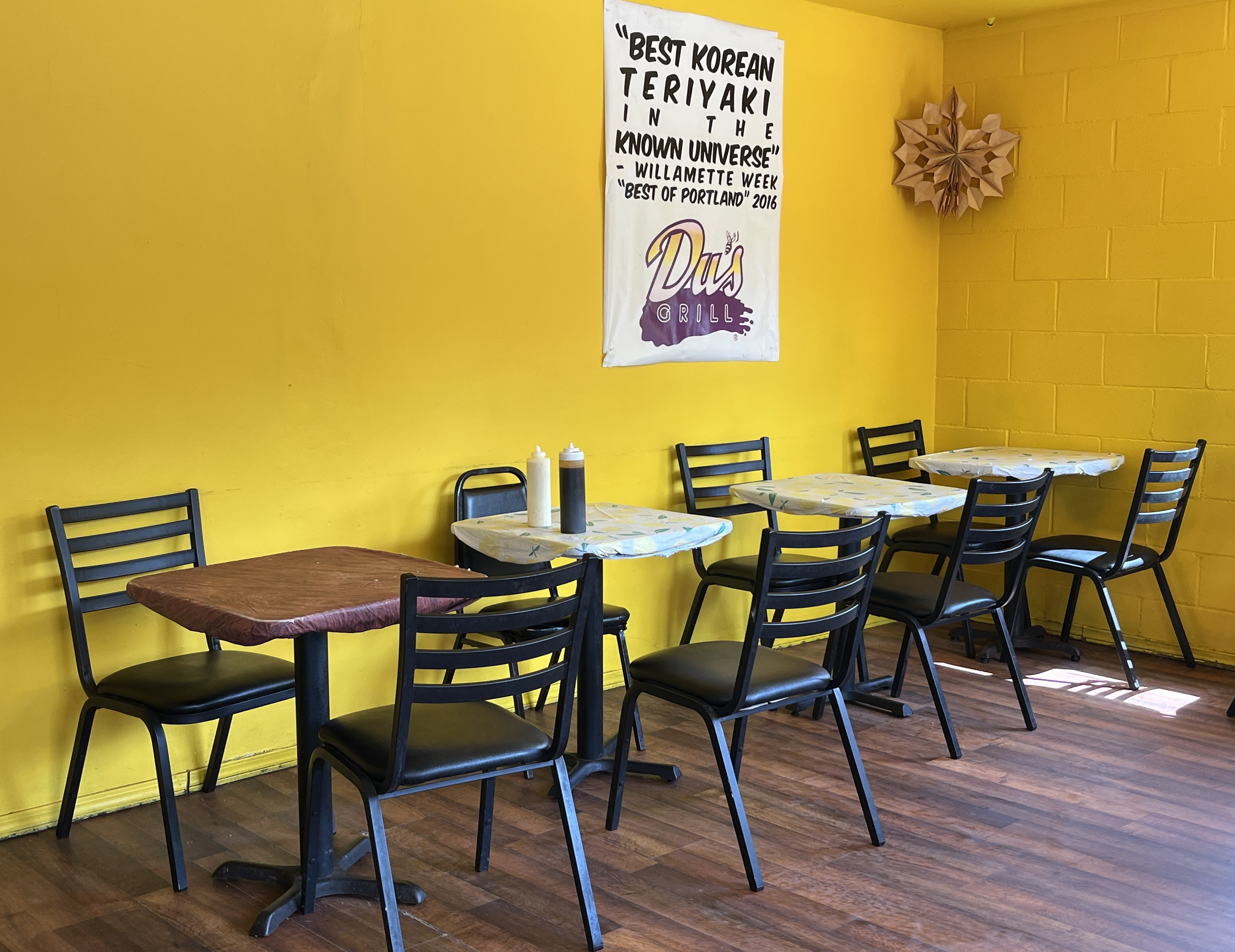
The restaurant's interior, 2025

The restaurant Du's Grill operates in Portland and Hillsboro, Oregon. The Portland restaurant, located on Sandy Boulevard in northeast Portland's Rose City Park neighborhood, is closed on weekends, while the Hillsboro location operates on Saturdays. The business specializes in teriyaki. Meat options include beef, chicken, and pork, and teriyaki is served with rice and iceberg salad and poppy seed dressing. The restaurant also serves kimchi, tofu bowls, and yakisoba.

== History ==
Du's Grill opened in 1995. has been owned by Anthony Park since 2009; previously, his parents Bae and Muncha Park operated the business starting in 1998. Anthony kept his parents' menu the same until the COVID-19 pandemic, when he and his wife introduced spicy chicken teriyaki.

The Hillsboro location, known as Du's Grill Westside, opened in 2018.

Du's Grill appears in the music video for Aminé's song "Blackjack". In the song "Turf", the rapper says, "Friends used to do pills and only eat at Du's Grill".

== Reception ==
In 2021, Katherine Chew Hamilton of Portland Monthly called Du's Grill "a true Portland institution" and "perhaps the city's finest example of the Korean-style teriyaki popular throughout the Pacific Northwest". She and Matthew Trueherz included the chicken teriyaki plate in the magazine's 2024 overview of "our 12 favorite budget-friendly Portland diishes under $13". Willamette Week has said Du's Grill offers "the best Korean teriyaki in the known universe". The restaurant was included in the newspaper's 2018 guide to inexpensive dining in outer northeast Portland, and Aaron Mesh said the teriyaki was "the best in the country" in 2023.

Janey Wong included Du's Grill in Eater Portland's 2023 overview of twelve "remarkable" restaurants in the Rose City Park and Roseway neighborhoods. Michael Russell included Du's Grill in The Oregonian's overviews of the forty "best inexpensive restaurants" in the metropolitan area. He had previously included the restaurant in the newspaper's 2018 overview of ten "cheap eats destinations" in Beaverton and Hillsboro, noting the outposts's upcoming launch.

Aminé is a fan of the restaurant and ate there for his eighteenth birthday. He has said, "I was just constantly going there as a teenager; Du's is such a staple. On my 18th birthday, I had no plans, so my friends and I went there, we went to that park right by Grant, and I ate my Du's for my 18th birthday. I had a sentimental mood that birthday."

== See also ==
- List of Korean restaurants
