= Liberty Bell (Portland, Oregon) =

Bell in Portland, Oregon

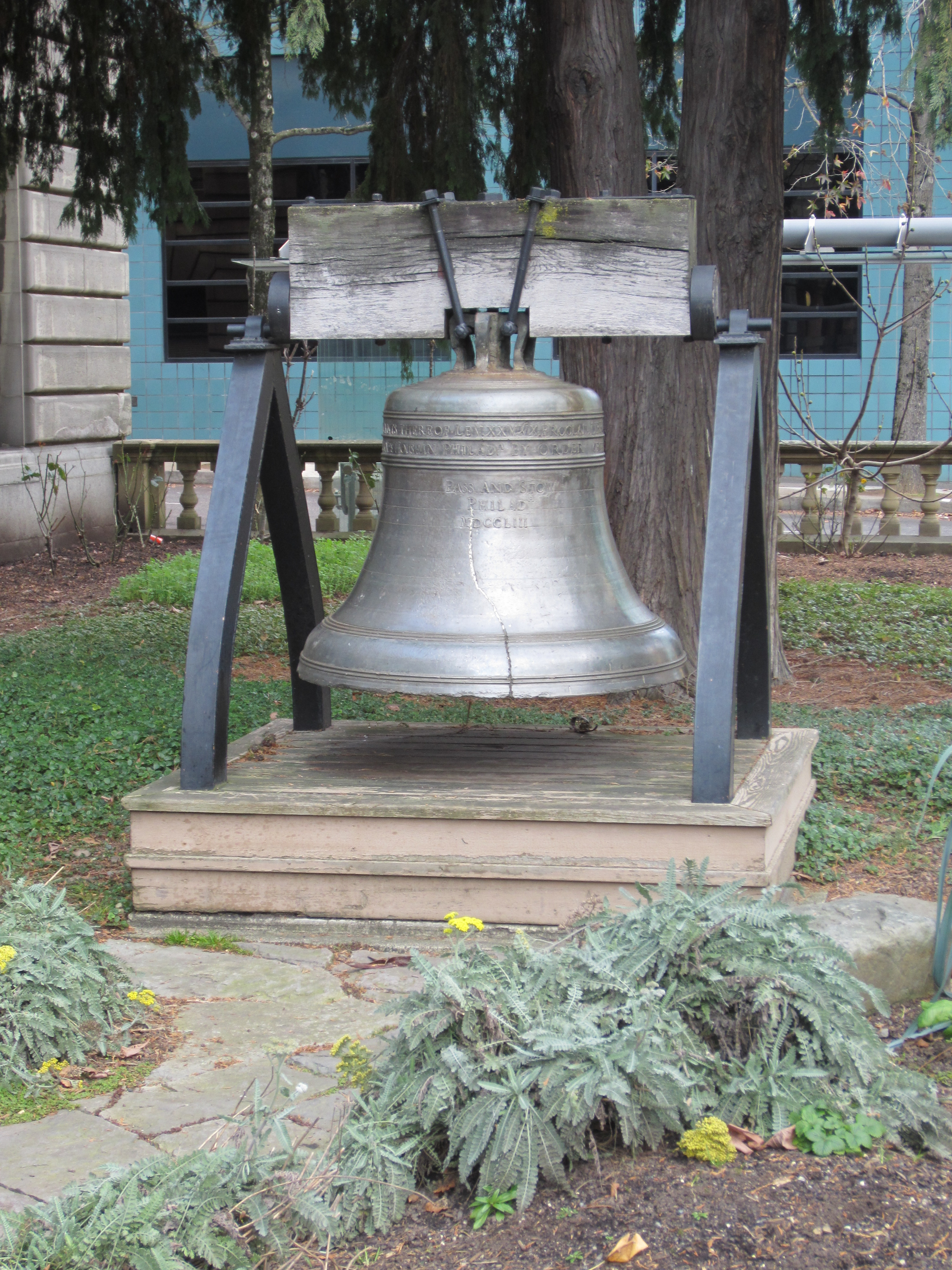
- Portland's second Liberty Bell replica, located outside of City Hall's east portico, in 2012
- Year: First replica: June 1963; Second replica: c. 1972
- Type: Sculpture
- Medium: Sculpture: Best Genuine Bell Metal, 16% min-copper alloy; Base: brick, metal (steel), wood (mahogany)
- Subject: Liberty Bell
- Dimensions: 1.7 m × 1.6 m × 1.7 m (66 in × 64 in × 66 in)
- Weight: 1 tonne (1,000 kg)
- Condition: "Treatment needed" (1993)
- Location: Portland, Oregon, United States; 45.51508°N 122.67869°W

Liberty Bell refers to one of two replicas in Portland, Oregon, United States, of the original Liberty Bell in Philadelphia. The first replica was purchased in 1962, and installed in the rotunda of City Hall in 1964. On November 21, 1970, it was destroyed in a bomb blast that also damaged the building's east portico. The second replica was installed outside of City Hall soon after the blast (c. 1972) with funds from private donations. It was dedicated on November 6, 1975. The bell is listed as a state veterans memorial by the Oregon Department of Veterans' Affairs.

== Description ==
The 1 ton (910 kg; 0.89 long tons) bell is made of Best Genuine Bell Metal, a sixteen percent min-copper alloy, and measures approximately 66 by 64 by 66 inches (1.7 m × 1.6 m × 1.7 m). It is attached to a horizontal beam that is supported by two V-shaped beams. The base is made of brick, metal (steel) and wood (mahogany covering) that measures approximately 13 by 76 by 54.5 inches (0.33 m × 1.93 m × 1.38 m).

The west side displays the inscription Pass and Stow / Philada / MDCCLIII. Raised lettering along the top of the bell reads PROCLAIM LIBERTY THROUGHOUT ALL THE LAND UNTO ALL THE INHABITANTS THEREOF LEV. XX VVX. / BY ORDER OF THE ASSEMBLY OF THE PROVINCE OF PENNSYLVANIA FOR THE STATE HOUSE IN PHILADA. The founder's mark also appears. The Smithsonian Institution's "Save Outdoor Sculpture!" program categorizes the sculpture as allegorical for symbolizing liberty.

== History ==
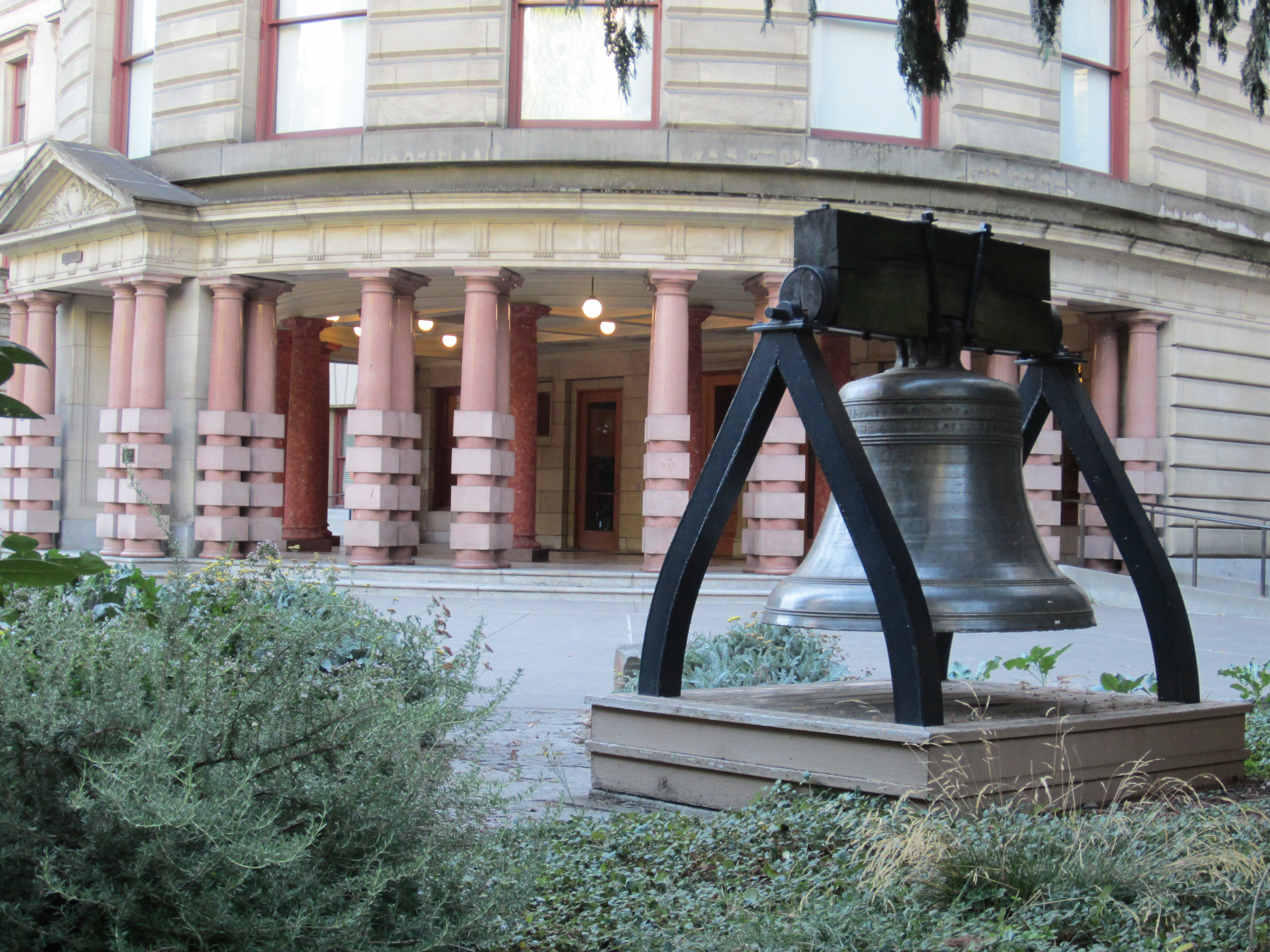
The bell outside Portland City Hall's east portico, 2012

Portland has had two replicas of Philadelphia's original Liberty Bell. The first replica was purchased in 1962 for $8,000. It was constructed at the McShane Bell Foundry in Baltimore and received a 25-year guarantee against breakage. The bell arrived in Portland in June 1963, with a damaged base and beam since the sculpture had slipped off its supports. Repairs were made before the replica was paraded through the city on a flatbed truck, then put into storage until Independence Day, when the bell was presented to the city. It was publicly rung for the first time during holiday celebrations and installed in City Hall's rotunda on May 5, 1964.

On November 21, 1970, a dynamite bomb that had been placed beneath the bell detonated, damaging City Hall's east portico columns, shattering windows, and destroying the replica. No one was injured, but "shards of bell went everywhere through the main portico". The crime remains unsolved; no one claimed responsibility or was prosecuted for the blast. In 1993, The Oregonian said: "Wild, highly vocal speculation blamed the blast on either left-wing or right-wing terrorists, depending, of course, on the accusers' own political persuasions. Others guessed it was a monumental prank that careened out of control."

Portland's second replica is located outside of City Hall's east portico, near the intersection of Southwest Fourth and Madison streets and across from Terry Schrunk Plaza. Private donations totaling $8,000 allowed a new bell to be purchased for $6,000 and installed not long after the blast (c. 1972). The bell has also been attributed as a gift from Philadelphia residents to Portland school children. It was dedicated on November 6, 1975. The replica was surveyed and considered "treatment needed" by the "Save Outdoor Sculpture!" program in October 1993. The Oregon Department of Veterans' Affairs lists the bell as one of the state's veterans memorials. It has been included in published walking tours of Portland.

== See also ==
- 1963 in art
- 1972 in art
- Liberty Bell (Oregon State Capitol), Salem
