= 69 Leonard Street =

Japanese restaurant in New York City

- Interactive map of 69 Leonard Street

Restaurant information
- Established: 2017
- Owner: Idan Elkon
- Food type: Japanese
- Dress code: Formal
- Rating: Michelin Guide: stars (2022–2025)
- Location: 69 Leonard Street, Manhattan, New York, 10013, United States
- Coordinates: 40°43′19″N 74°00′36″W
- Seating capacity: 12
- Reservations: Yes
- Website: www.69leonardstreet.com

69 Leonard Street, or Shion 69 Leonard, is a Michelin-starred sushi restaurant in New York City, located in Tribeca, serving traditional Edo-mae style sushi. The first sushi-ya, or sushi chef, was Eiji Ichimura from Sushi Ichimura in 2017, followed by Derek Wilcox, and then Shion Uino, with the name changed to Shion after he became the sushi-ya. However, Shion left the restaurant in late December, 2025, and the name has been switched back. The current status of the restaurant is in limbo as they experienced a fire in early December 2025, and it has since been closed for reservations. As of 2025, the restaurant costs $480 a person, including a mandatory 20% tip, making it also one of the most expensive sushi spots in the city, behind only Yoshino, Sushi Sho, and Masa.

== See also ==
- List of Japanese restaurants
- List of Michelin-starred restaurants in New York City
- List of sushi restaurants
