= List of Japanese restaurants =

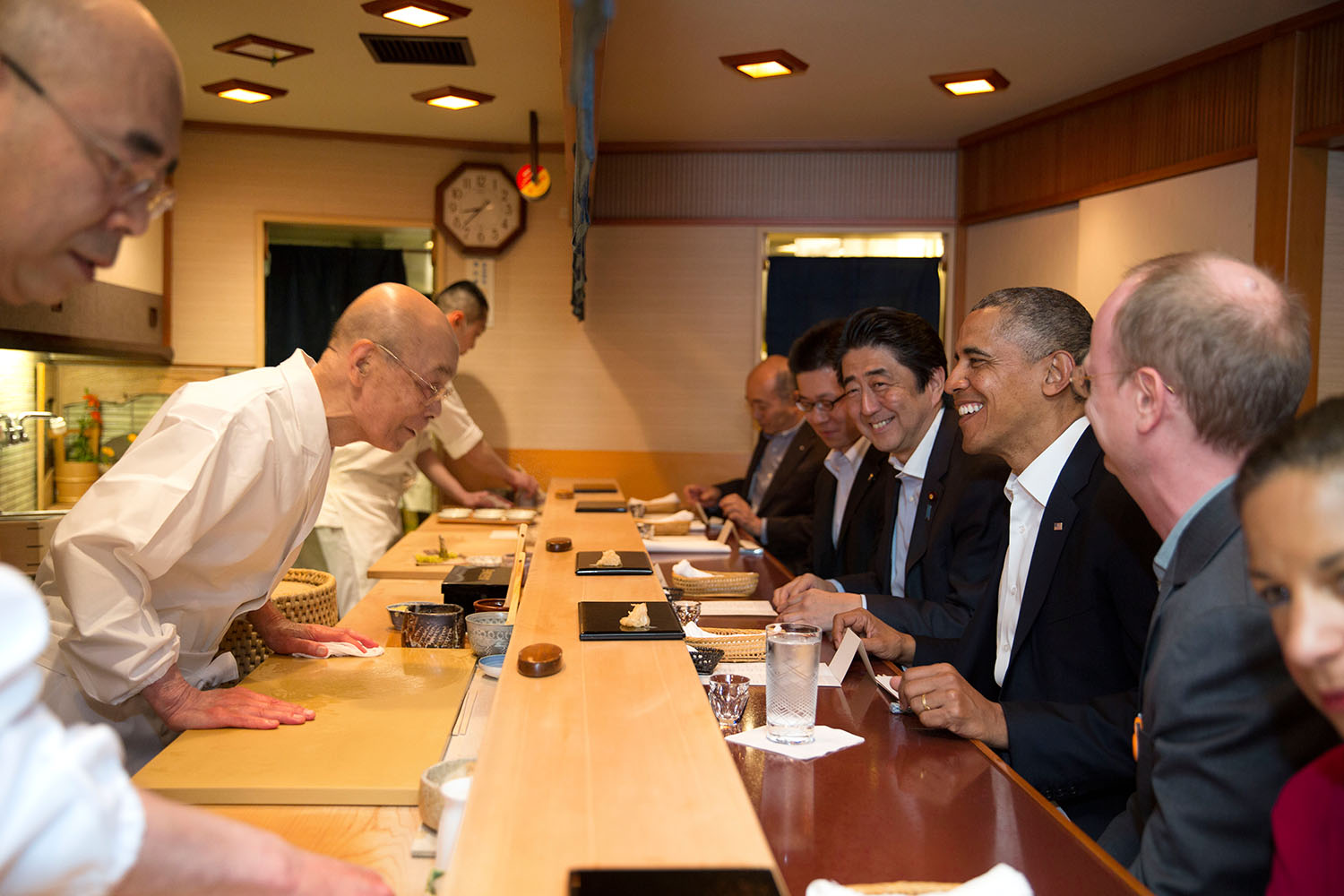
Prime Minister Abe and President Obama at Sukiyabashi Jiro, Tokyo, in April 2014

This is a list of notable Japanese restaurants. Japanese cuisine is the food—ingredients, preparation and way of eating—of Japan. The traditional food of Japan is based on rice with miso soup and other dishes, each in its own utensil, with an emphasis on seasonal ingredients. The side dishes often consist of fish, pickled vegetables, and vegetables cooked in broth. Fish is common in the traditional cuisine. It is often grilled, but it may also be served raw as sashimi or in sushi. Apart from rice, staples include noodles, such as soba and udon. Japan has many simmered dishes such as fish products in broth called oden, or beef in sukiyaki and nikujaga.

Types of Japanese restaurants include:

- Conveyor belt sushi – a sushi restaurant where the plates with the sushi are placed on a rotating conveyor belt or moat that winds through the restaurant and moves past every table and counter seat
- Izakaya – an informal Japanese gastropub
- Robatayaki – a method of cooking, similar to barbecue, in which items of food on skewers are slow-grilled over hot charcoal
- Ryōtei – a type of luxurious traditional Japanese restaurant. Traditionally they only accept new customers by referral and feature entertainment by geishas, but in modern times this is not always the case
- Teppanyaki – a style of Japanese cuisine that uses an iron griddle to cook food
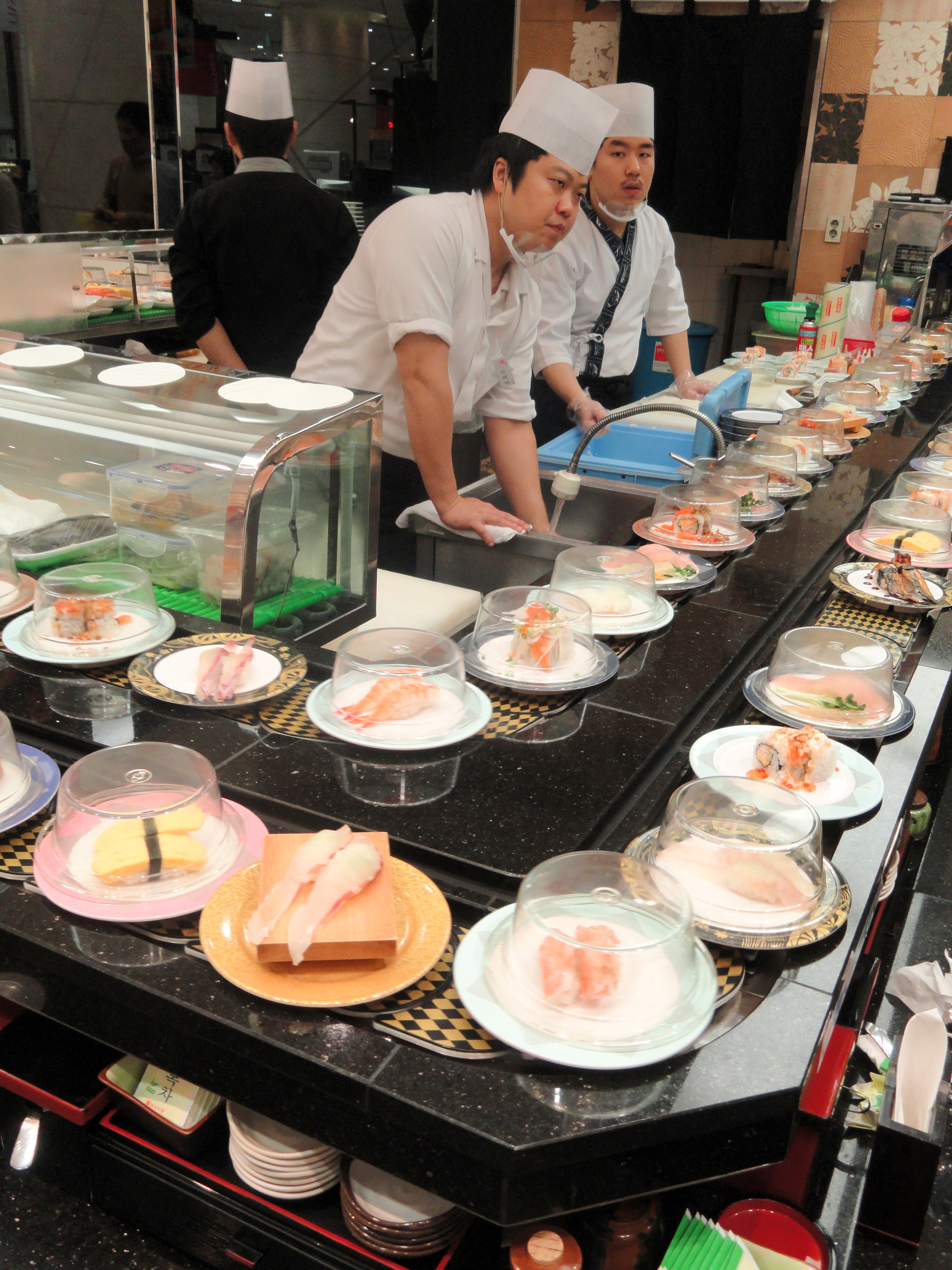
Conveyor belt sushi

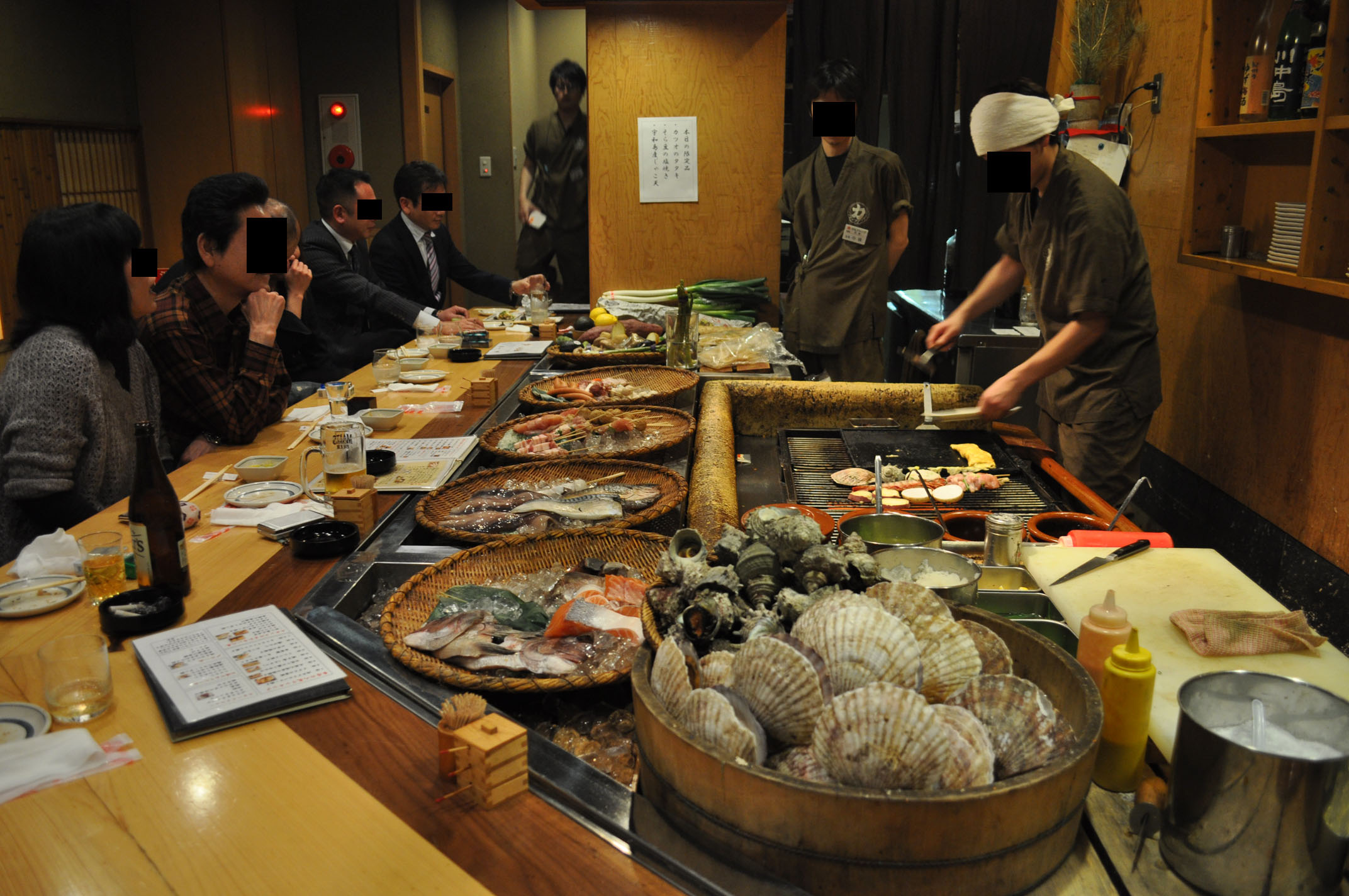
A Robatayaki restaurant in Osaka

== Notable Japanese restaurants ==
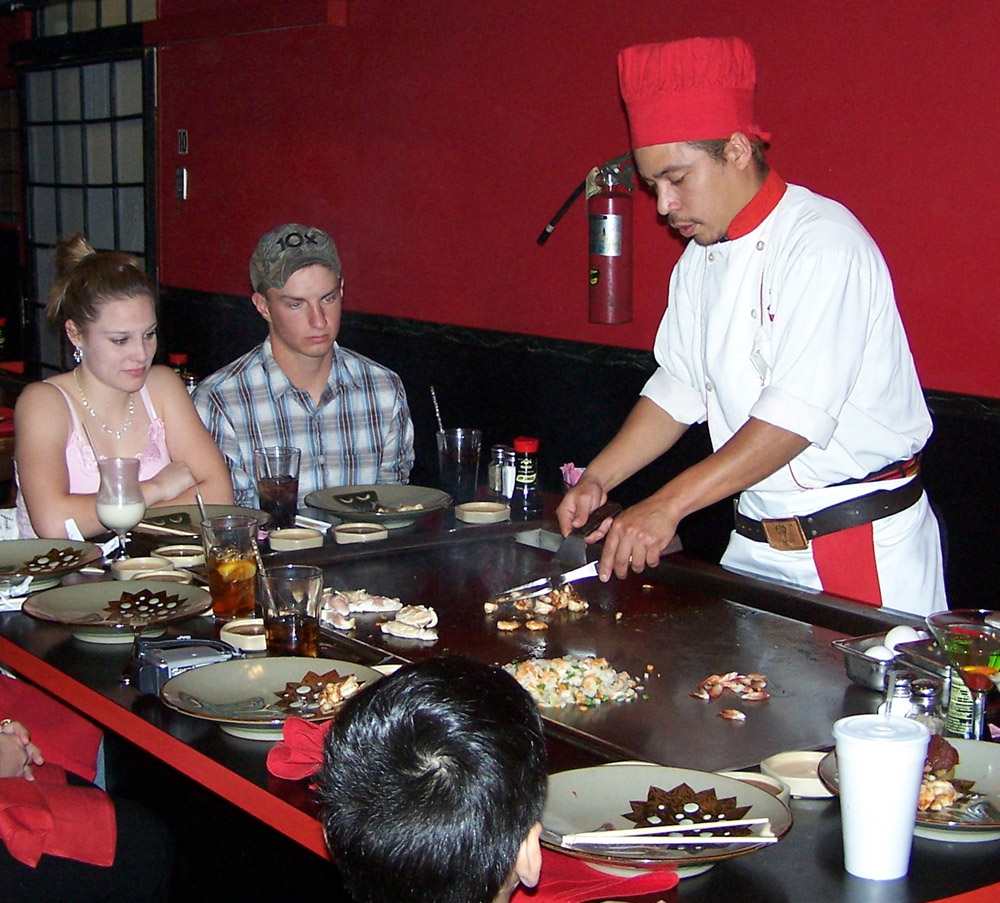
A chef preparing a dinner at a Benihana restaurant

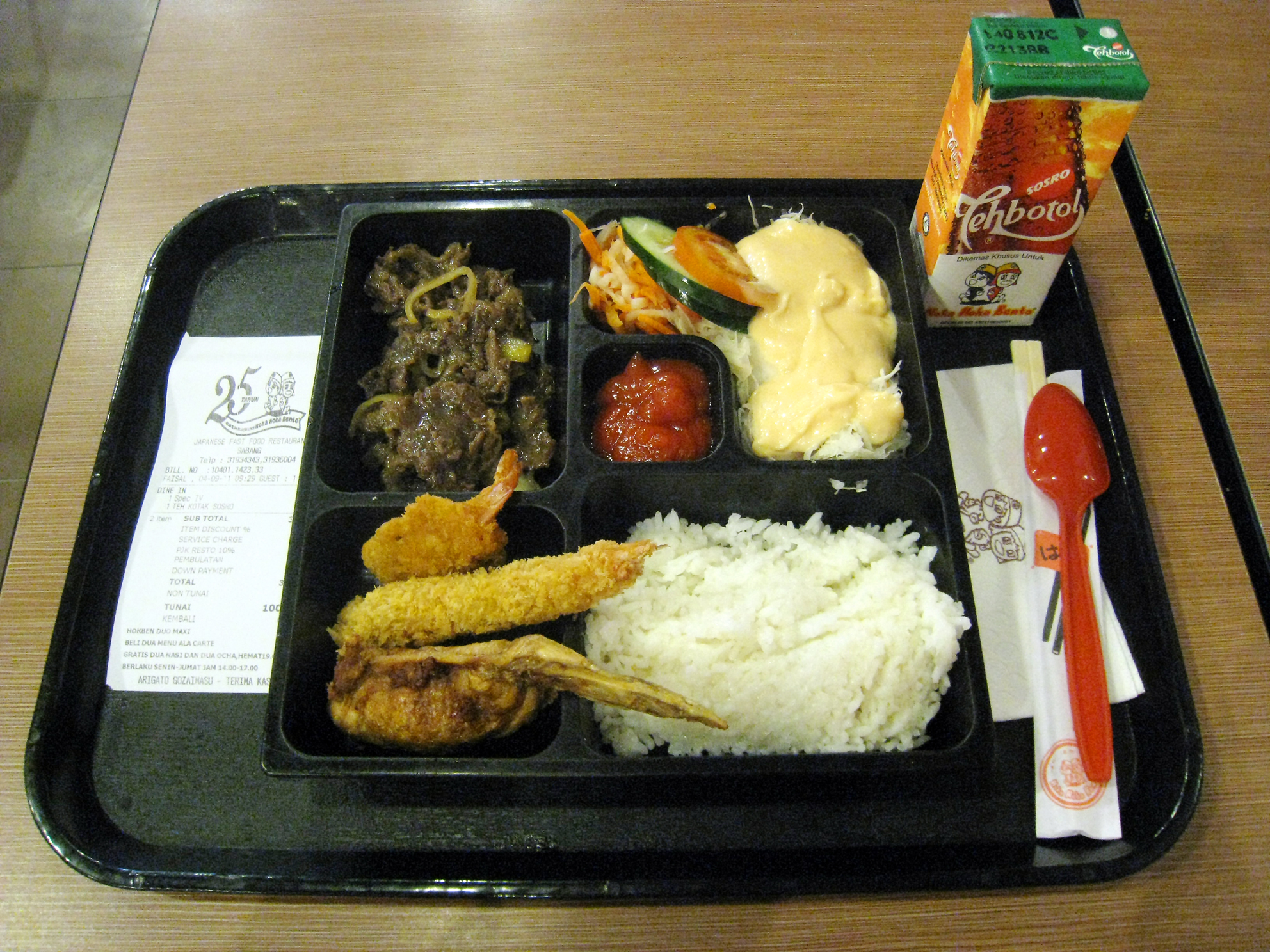
A bento meal at a HokBen restaurant

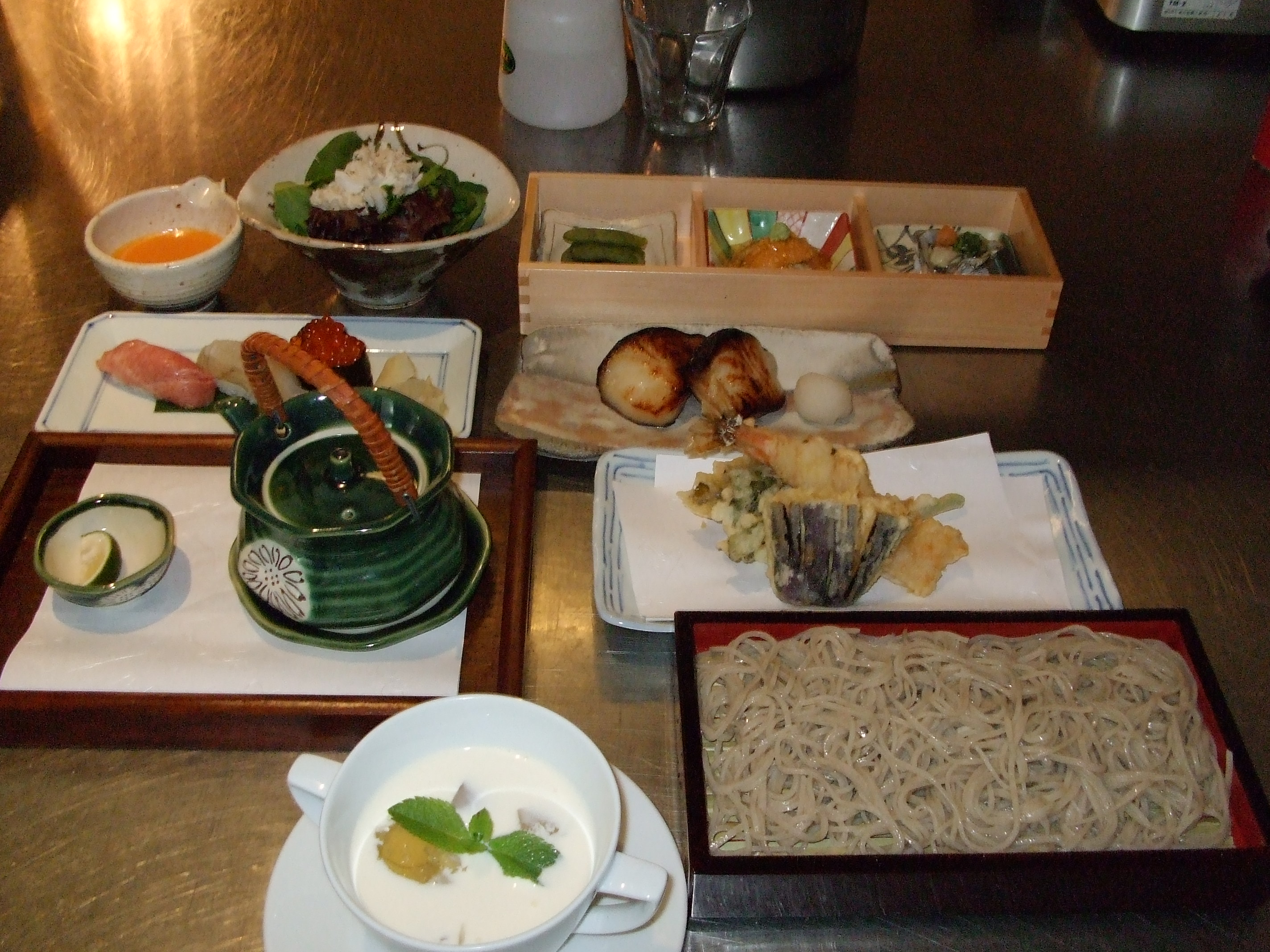
Various foods at a Matsugen restaurant

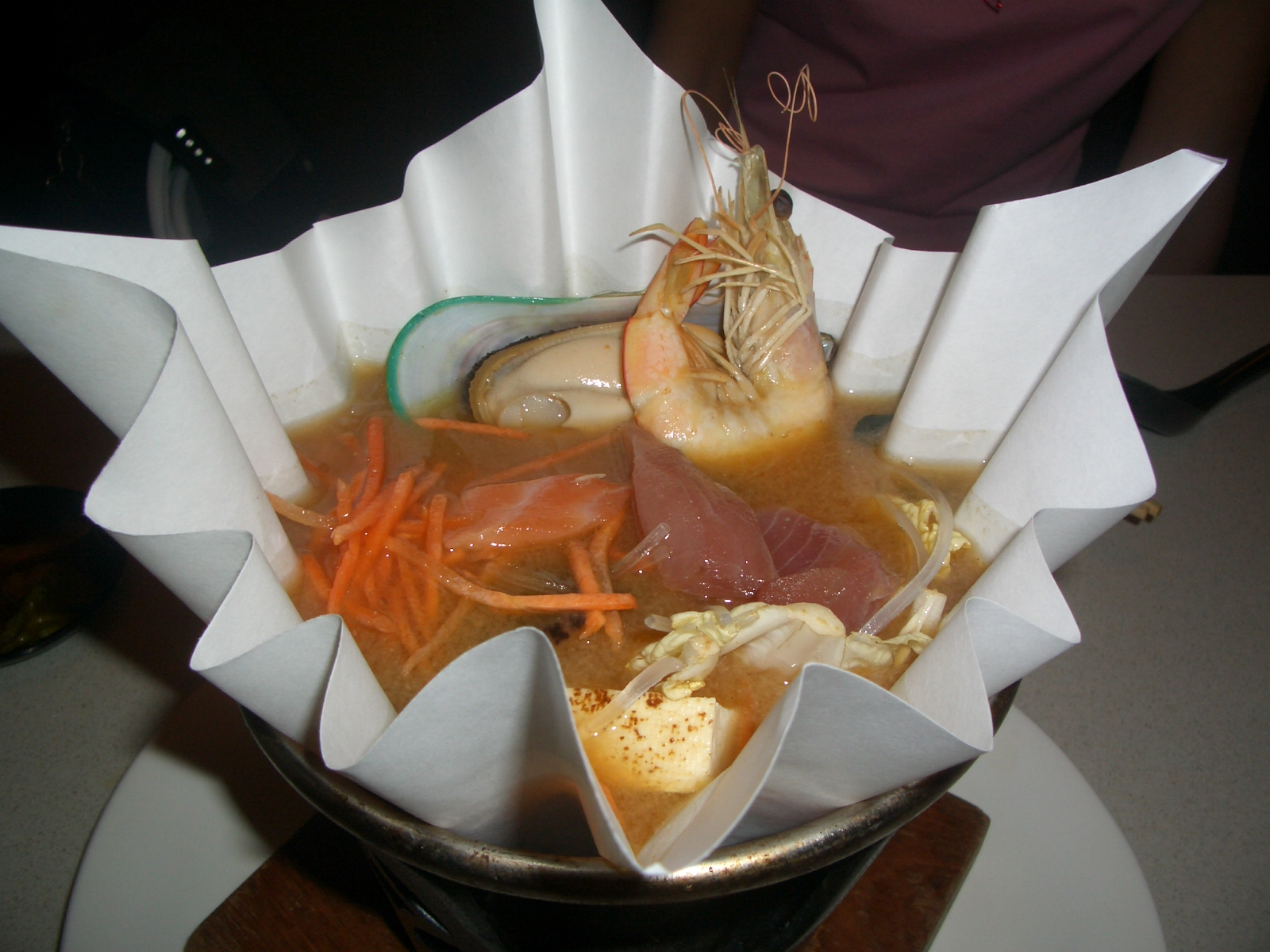
"Paper steamboat" is a Sakae Sushi dish

=== Japan ===
- Afuri
- Ajisen Ramen – Japanese ramen soup fast food chain
- Bincho – a London-based Japanese restaurant styled on the traditional izakayas found throughout Japan
- Florilege - Michelin-starred restaurant specializing in sustainable food
- Hokka Hokka Tei – a bento take-out chain with over 2,000 franchises and company-owned branches throughout Japan
- Kayabukiya Tavern – a traditional-style Japanese "sake-house" restaurant (izakaya) located in the city of Utsunomiya, north of Tokyo, Japan
- Marugame Seimen – A Japanese restaurant chain specializing in udon
- Marukin Ramen
- Matsugen – the name of several Japanese restaurants owned by the Matsushita brothers located in Tokyo, Hawaii, and New York City
- Matsukawa - an invitation-only kaiseki restaurant in Akasaka, Tokyo
- Matsuya – a Japanese fast-food chain specializing in rice bowls with meat
- Nihonryori Ryugin – a fusion cuisine restaurant in Roppongi, Minato-ku, Tokyo
- Okonomi-mura – a Hiroshima-style okonomiyaki food theme park located at 5-13 Shintenchi in Naka-ku, Hiroshima, Japan
- Ramen Ryoma
- Sukiya – a chain of gyūdon (beef bowl) restaurants
- Sukiyabashi Jiro – a sushi restaurant in Ginza, Chūō, Tokyo, Japan, it is owned and operated by sushi master Jiro Ono. The Michelin Guide has awarded it 3 stars. A two-star branch operated by his son Takashi is located at Roppongi Hills in Minato, Tokyo.
- Sushi Saito – a three Michelin star Japanese cuisine restaurant in Minato, Tokyo, primarily known for serving sushi
- Yoshinoya – a Japanese fast food restaurant chain, it is the largest chain of gyūdon (beef bowl) restaurants
- Tofuya Ukai - a tofu restaurant that serve dishes in "refined kaiseki stye"

=== Australia ===
- Tetsuya's – a restaurant in Sydney, Australia, owned and operated by world renowned chef Tetsuya Wakuda

=== Bangladesh ===
- Izumi

=== Brazil ===
- Koni Store – a Brazilian chain of Japanese food headquartered in Rio de Janeiro, Brazil

=== Canada ===
Notable Japanese restaurants in Canada include:

- Aburi Hana, Toronto, Ontario
- Kaiseki Yu-zen Hashimoto, Toronto, Ontario
- Kappo Sato, Toronto, Ontario
- Kissa Tanto, a Japanese-Italian fusion restaurant in Vancouver, British Columbia
- Masayoshi, Vancouver, British Columbia
- Motonobu Udon, Vancouver, British Columbia
- Okeya Kyujiro, Vancouver, British Columbia
- Sarku Japan – a quick serve restaurant chain based in Markham, Ontario, Canada serving Japanese teppanyaki and sushi
- Shoushin, Toronto, Ontario
- Sumibiyaki Arashi, Vancouver, British Columbia
- Sushi Hil, Vancouver, British Columbia
- Sushi Hyun, Vancouver, British Columbia
- Sushi Masuda, Vancouver, British Columbia
- Yukashi, a Michelin-starred restaurant in Toronto, Ontario

=== Denmark ===
- Sticks'n'Sushi – a Copenhagen-based restaurant and take-away chain specializing in sushi and yakitori sticks

=== Indonesia ===
- HokBen – a Japanese fast food chain of restaurants based in Jakarta, Indonesia

=== Singapore ===
- Sakae Sushi – a restaurant chain based in Singapore serving Japanese cuisine, and is the flagship brand of Apex-Pal International Ltd.
- Standing Sushi Bar – a Japanese-food restaurant chain in Singapore and Indonesia

=== United Kingdom ===
- The Araki
- Feng Sushi – a UK-based restaurant chain known for advocating sustainable fish farming
- Humble Chicken, London
- Itsu – a British chain of Asian-inspired fast food shops and restaurants, and a grocery company
- Tokyo Diner – a three-floor Japanese restaurant on the corner of Newport Place and Lisle Street in the "Chinatown" area of the West End of London
- Uma, London
- Wagamama – restaurant chain
- Wasabi – restaurant chain
- YO! Sushi - restaurant chain
- Zuma – founded by chef Rainer Becker, inspired by informal izakaya-style Japanese dining in which dishes are brought to the table continuously throughout the meal

=== United Arab Emirates ===
Notable Japanese restaurants in United Arab Emirates include:

- 99 Sushi Bar, Abu Dhabi
- Hōseki, Dubai
- Sagetsu by Tetsuya, Dubai

=== United States ===
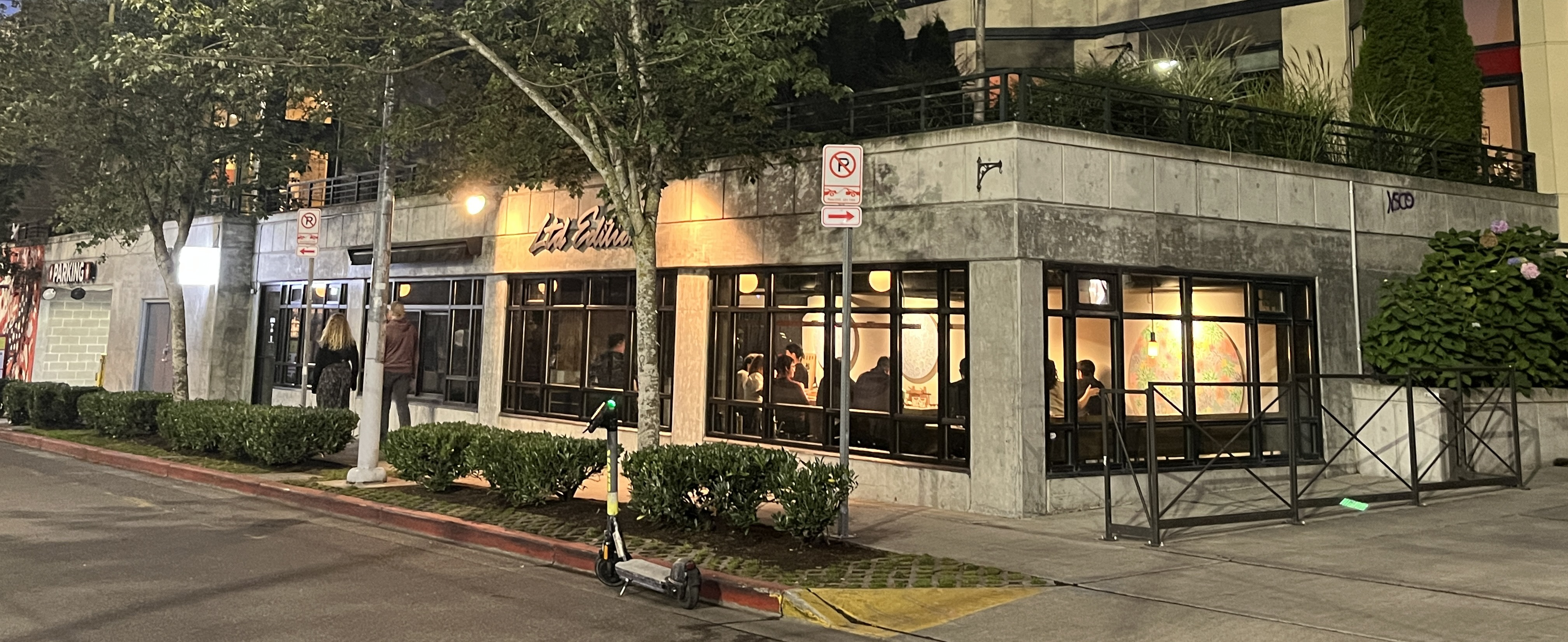
Ltd Edition Sushi, Seattle

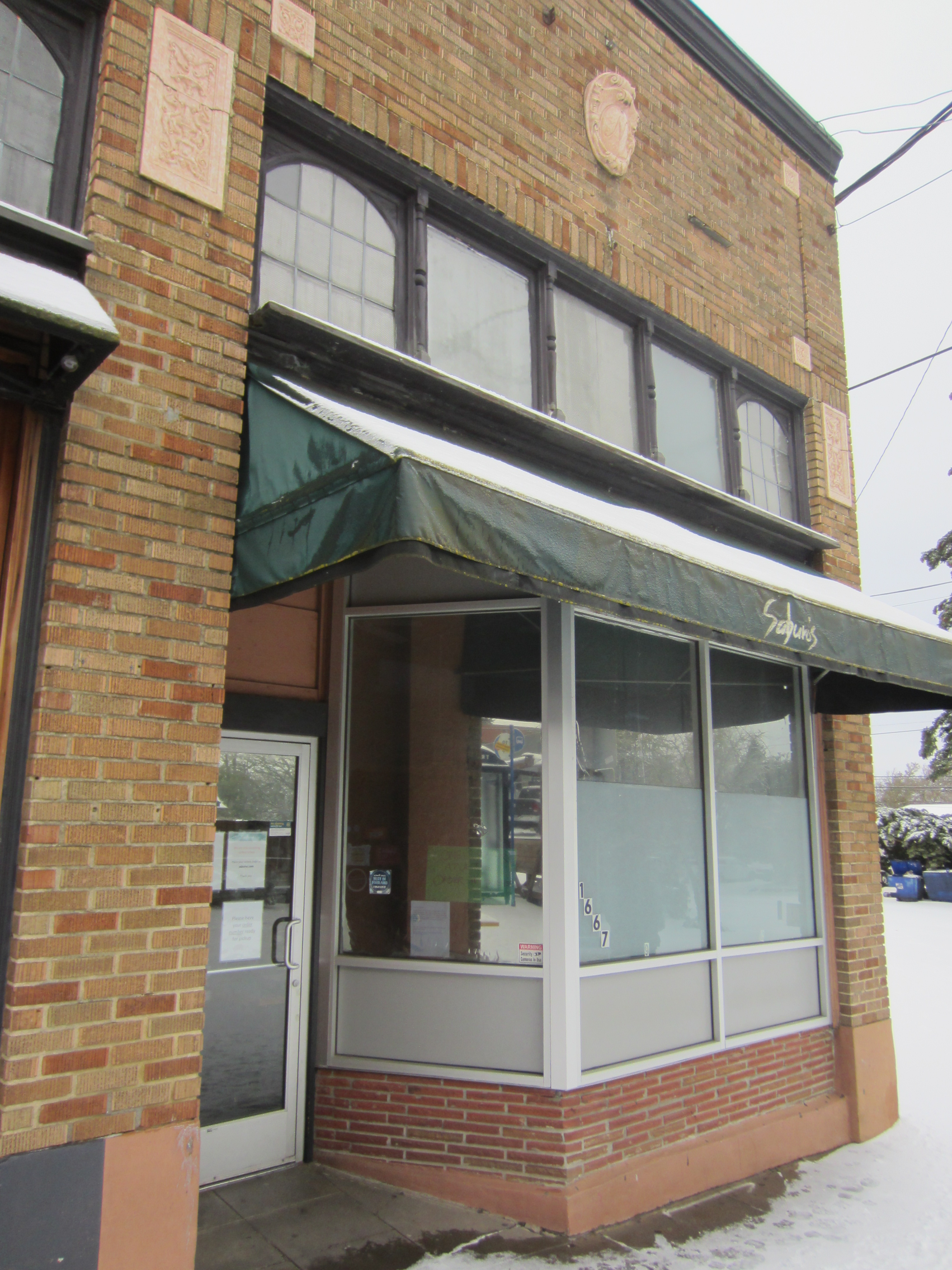
Saburo's, Portland, Oregon

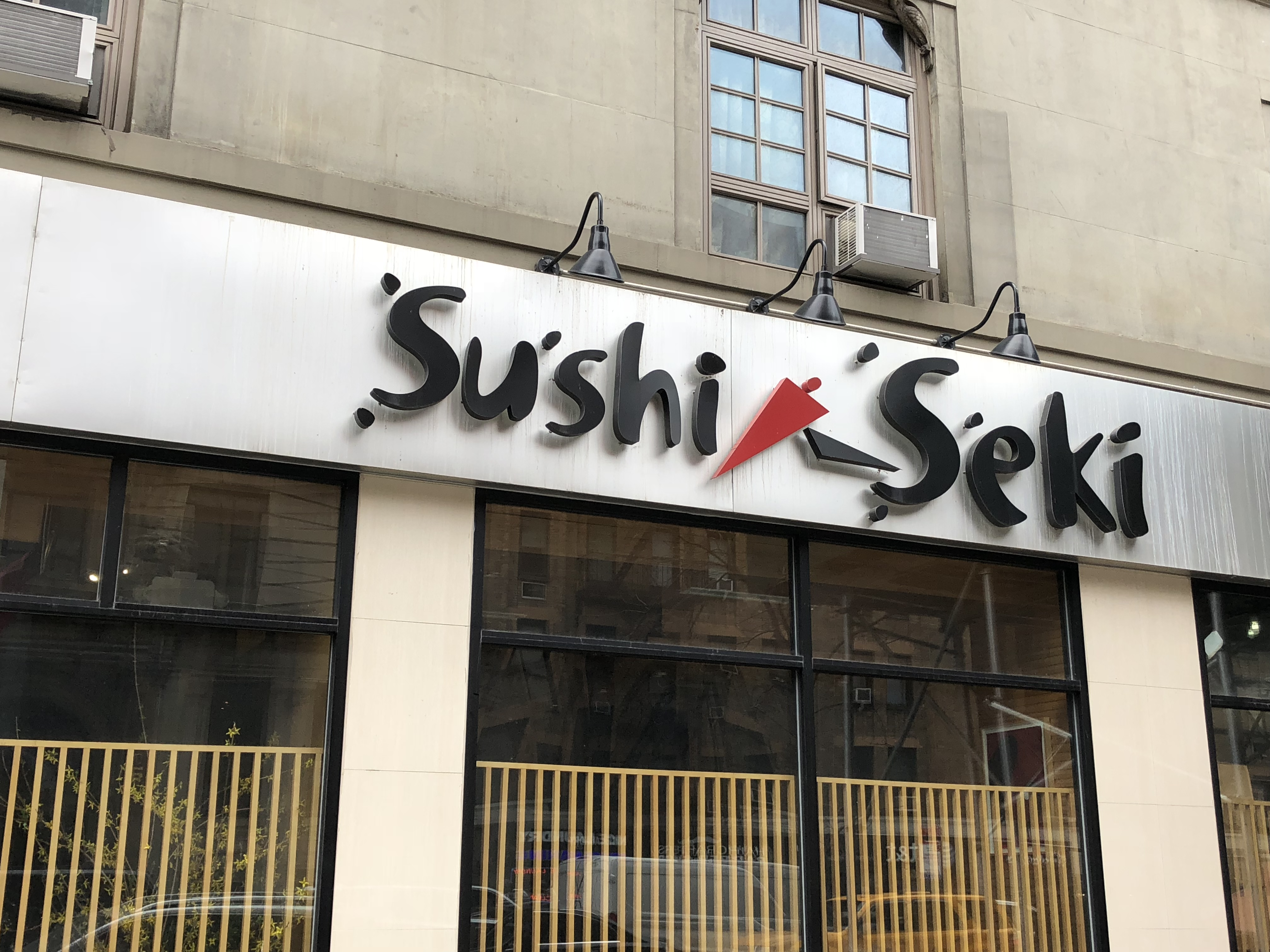
Sushi Seki, New York City

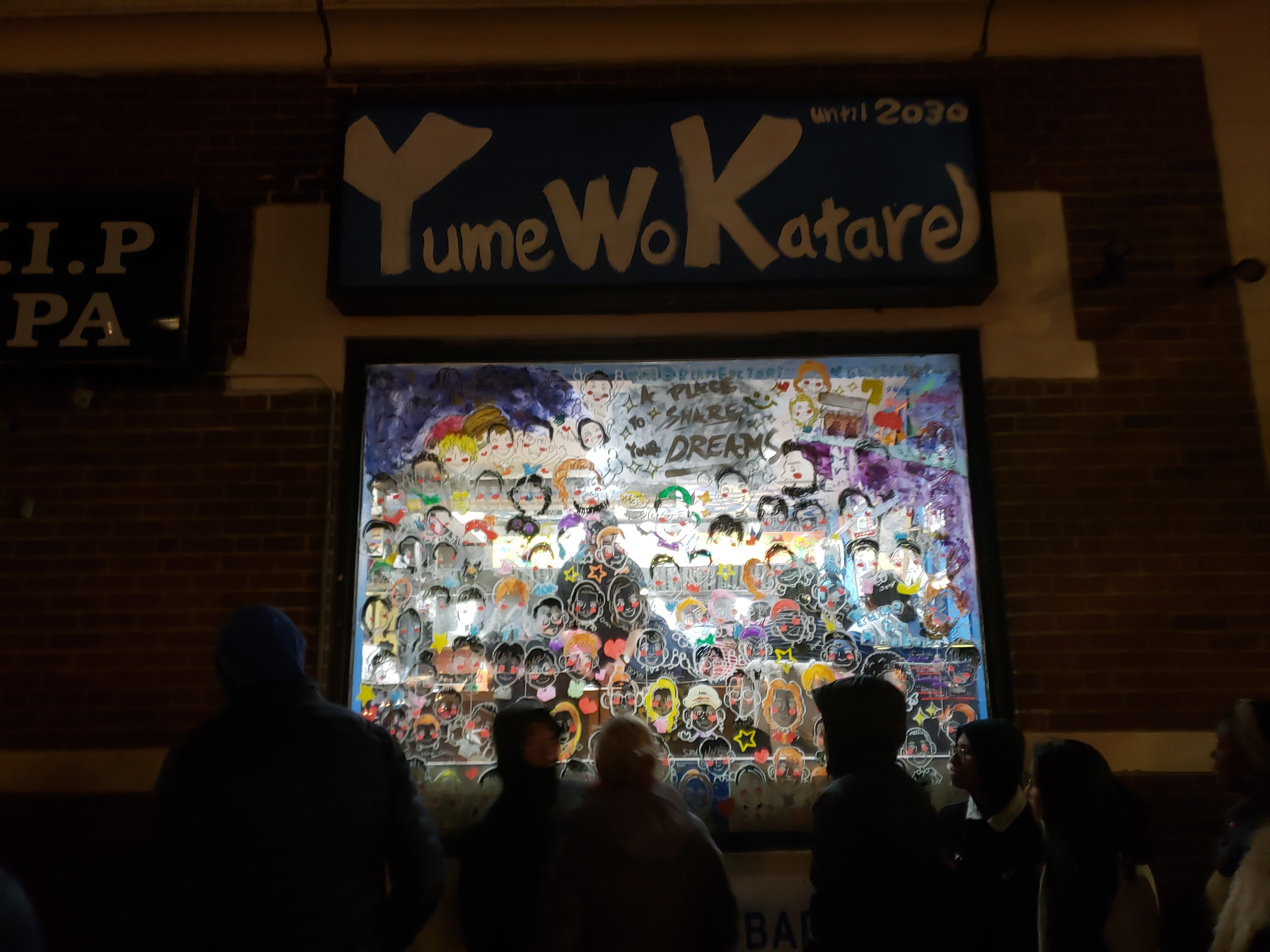
Yume Wo Katare, Cambridge, Massachusetts

Notable Japanese restaurants in the United States include:

- 15 East, New York City
- 715, Los Angeles, California
- Asanebo, Los Angeles, California
- Bamboo Sushi, Portland, Oregon
- Bar Miller, New York City, New York
- Behind the Museum Café, Portland, Oregon
- Benihana – an American restaurant company based in Aventura, Florida. It owns or franchises Japanese cuisine restaurants around the world
- Biwa, Portland, Oregon
- Bluefin Tuna and Sushi, Portland, Oregon
- Boxer Ramen, Portland, Oregon
- Bush Garden, Seattle, Washington
- Cagen, New York City, New York
- Craft Omakase, Austin, Texas
- Cranes, Washington, D.C.
- Gasho of Japan, New York
- Hana re, Costa Mesa, California
- Hapa PDX, Portland, Oregon
- Hashiri, San Francisco, California
- Hayakawa, Atlanta, Georgia
- Hayato, Los Angeles, California
- Hiden, Miami, Florida
- Icca, New York City
- Itsumono, Seattle, Washington
- Ivan Ramen – New York City
- Jinya Ramen Bar – a chain of restaurants based in Los Angeles, California, specializing in ramen noodle dishes
- Jewel Bako, New York City
- Jōji, New York City
- Kadence, Florida
- Kaede, Portland, Oregon
- Kajitsu, New York City
- Kamonegi, Seattle, Washington
- Kanoyama, New York City
- Katsu Burger, Washington State
- Kenzo, Napa, California
- Kikko
- Kinboshi Ramen, Portland, Oregon
- Kinjo, San Francisco, California
- Kisser, Nashville, Tennessee
- Kizaki, Denver, Colorado
- Kona Grill – based in Scottsdale, Arizona; operates over 30 locations in the U.S.
- Kono, New York City
- Kosaka, New York City
- Kosen, Tampa, Florida
- Koya, Tampa, Florida
- Kurumazushi, New York City
- Kusakabe, San Francisco
- 69 Leonard Street, New York City
- Kyo Ya, New York City
- Ltd Edition Sushi, Seattle
- Mako, Chicago
- Masa – New York City
- Menya Hosaki, Washington, D.C.
- Mio Sushi, Portland, Oregon
- Momiji, Seattle
- Mori Nozomi, Los Angeles, California
- Morihiro, Los Angeles
- Mujō, Atlanta, Georgia
- Murata, Portland, Oregon
- n/naka, Los Angeles
- Natsu, Orlando, Florida
- Nisei, San Francisco
- Noda, New York City
- Nodoguro, Portland, Oregon
- Noodle in a Haystack, San Francisco
- Noz 17, New York City
- Nozawa Bar, Beverly Hills, California
- O Ya, Boston
- Obon Shokudo
- Odo, New York City
- Okuda, New York City
- Omakase, San Francisco
- Omakase at Barracks Row, Washington, D.C.
- Omakase Yume, Chicago, Illinois
- Ooink, Seattle, Washington
- Q Sushi, Los Angeles, California
- Rebel Omakase, Laguna Beach, California
- Saburo's, Portland, Oregon
- Sasabune – a Japanese sushi restaurant located on the Upper East Side of Manhattan, in New York City
- Satsuki, New York City
- Shin Sushi, Los Angeles, California
- Shizuku by Chef Naoko, Portland, Oregon
- The Shota, San Francisco, California
- Shota Omakase, Brooklyn, New York
- Shunji, Santa Monica, California
- Silvers Omakase, Santa Barbara, California
- Soichi, San Diego, California
- Sorekara
- Soseki, Florida
- Soto, New York City
- Sushi Amane, New York City
- Sushi Azabu, New York City
- Sushi Ginza Onodera, Honolulu, Hawaii
- Sushi Ichiban, Portland, Oregon
- Sushi Ichimura, New York City
- Sushi Inaba, Torrance, California
- Sushi Inoue, New York City
- Sushi Kaneyoshi, Los Angeles, California
- Sushi Kashiba, Seattle, Washington
- Sushi Noz, New York City
- Sushi of Gari – New York City
- Sushi Seki – New York City
- Sushi Shin, Redwood City, California
- Sushi Sho, New York City, New York
- Sushi Tadokoro, San Diego, California
- Sushi Taro, Washington, D.C.
- Sushi Yasuda – New York City, New York
- Sushi Yoshizumi, San Mateo, California
- Sushi Zo, Los Angeles and New York City
- Takibi, Portland, Oregon
- Taku – Seattle; owned by Shota Nakajima
- Tamari Bar, Seattle, Washington
- Tanaka, Portland, Oregon
- Tanuki, Portland, Oregon
- Tatsu Dallas, Dallas, Texas
- Tempura Matsui, New York City
- Tokyo Sando, Portland, Oregon
- Torien, New York City
- Torishin, New York City
- Tsukimi, New York City
- Uka, Los Angeles, California
- Ushiwakamaru, New York City
- Wako, San Francisco, California
- Wakuriya, San Mateo, California
- Yamada, New York City, New York
- Yess, Los Angeles, California
- Yoko's Japanese Restaurant and Sushi Bar
- Yoshi's – San Francisco Bay Area
- Yoshi's Sushi, Portland, Oregon
- Yoshino, New York City
- Yoshitomo, Omaha, Nebraska
- Yume Wo Katare – Cambridge, Massachusetts
- Zilla Sake, Portland, Oregon

== See also ==
- List of Japanese condiments
- List of Japanese cooking utensils
- List of Japanese dishes
  - List of Japanese desserts and sweets
- List of Japanese ingredients
- Lists of restaurants
- List of sushi restaurants
- Ramen shop
- Restaurants in Japan (category)
