= Tanuki =

Tanuki may refer to:

- Japanese raccoon dog, or tanuki, a species of canid mammal
- Tanuki, a deadwood bonsai technique
- Tanuki (restaurant), defunct Japanese restaurant
- Lake Tanuki, near Mount Fuji, Japan

== See also ==
- Bake-danuki, a type of spirit in Japanese mythology that appears in the form of the Japanese raccoon dog
- Tanuki Suit, a raccoon-tailed power-up in the Super Mario video game series
