= Takibi =

Japanese bar and restaurant in Portland, Oregon, U.S.

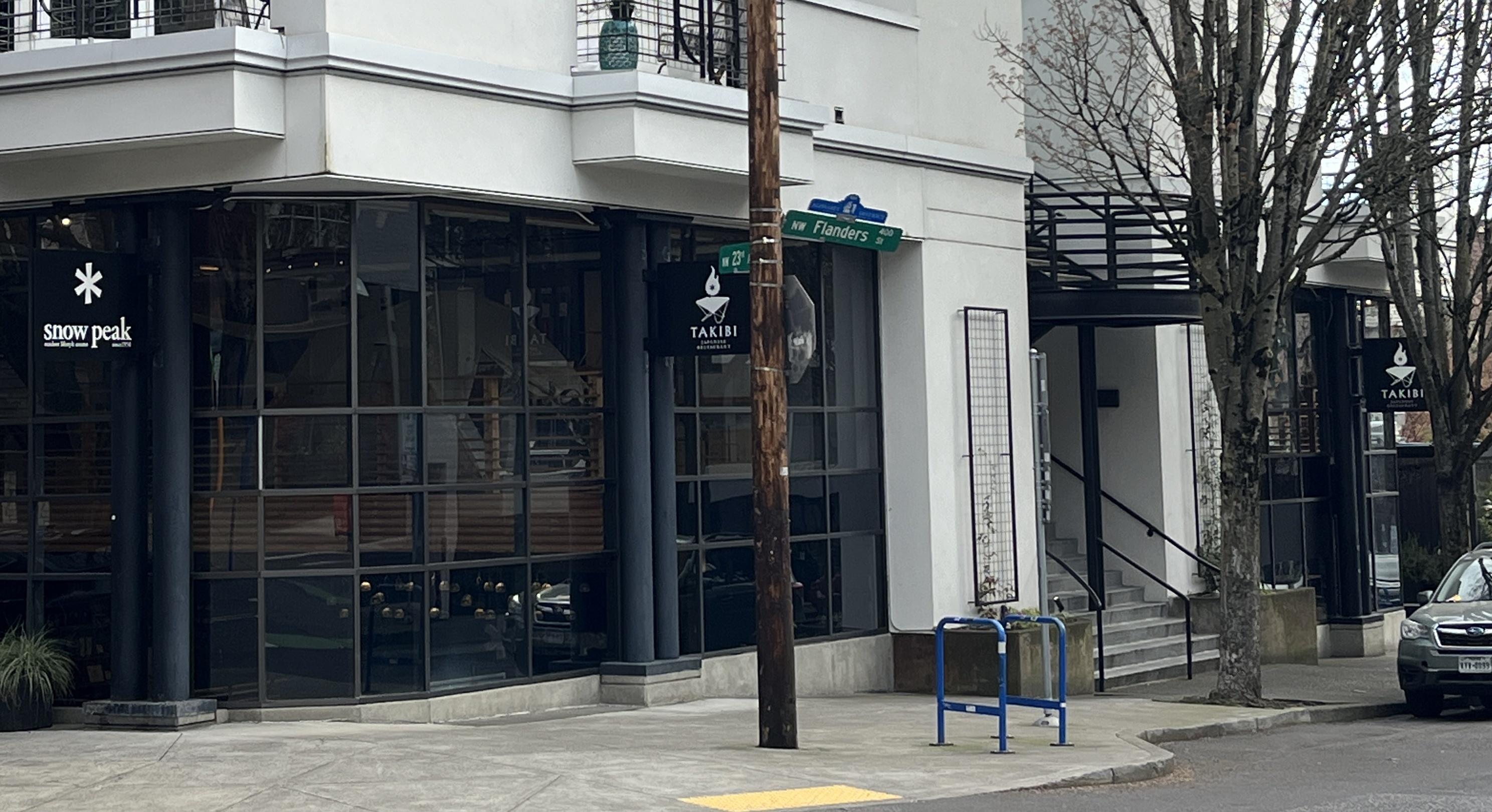
- The restaurant's exterior, 2026
- Interactive map of Takibi

Restaurant information
- Food type: Japanese
- Location: 2275 NW Flanders Street, Portland, Multnomah, Oregon, 97210, United States
- Coordinates: 45°31′32″N 122°41′53″W

Takibi is a Japanese bar and restaurant in Portland, Oregon, United States. Located in northwest Portland's Northwest District, it was named one of the best bars in the U.S. by Esquire in 2022. Cody Auger is the chef.

Michael Russell included the shoyu ramen in The Oregonian's list of Portland's ten best dishes of 2024.

== See also ==
- List of Japanese restaurants
