= Noodle in a Haystack =

Restaurant in San Francisco, California, U.S.

- Interactive map of Noodle in a Haystack

Restaurant information
- Food type: Japanese
- Location: 4601 Geary Boulevard, San Francisco, California, 94118, United States
- Coordinates: 37°46′50.3″N 122°28′7.4″W
- Website: noodleinhaystack.com

Noodle in a Haystack is a Japanese restaurant in San Francisco, California. Established in April 2022, the business was included in The New York Times's 2023 list of the 50 best restaurants in the United States.

== See also ==
- List of Japanese restaurants
