= Satsuki (restaurant) =

Japanese restaurant in New York City, U.S.

- Interactive map of Satsuki

Restaurant information
- Established: 2017
- Food type: Japanese
- Location: 114 West 47th Street, New York City, New York, 10036, United States
- Coordinates: 40°45′30″N 73°58′59″W

Satsuki is a Japanese restaurant in New York City. The restaurant has received a Michelin star.

== See also ==
- List of Japanese restaurants
- List of Michelin-starred restaurants in New York City
