= Icca =

Japanese restaurant in New York City

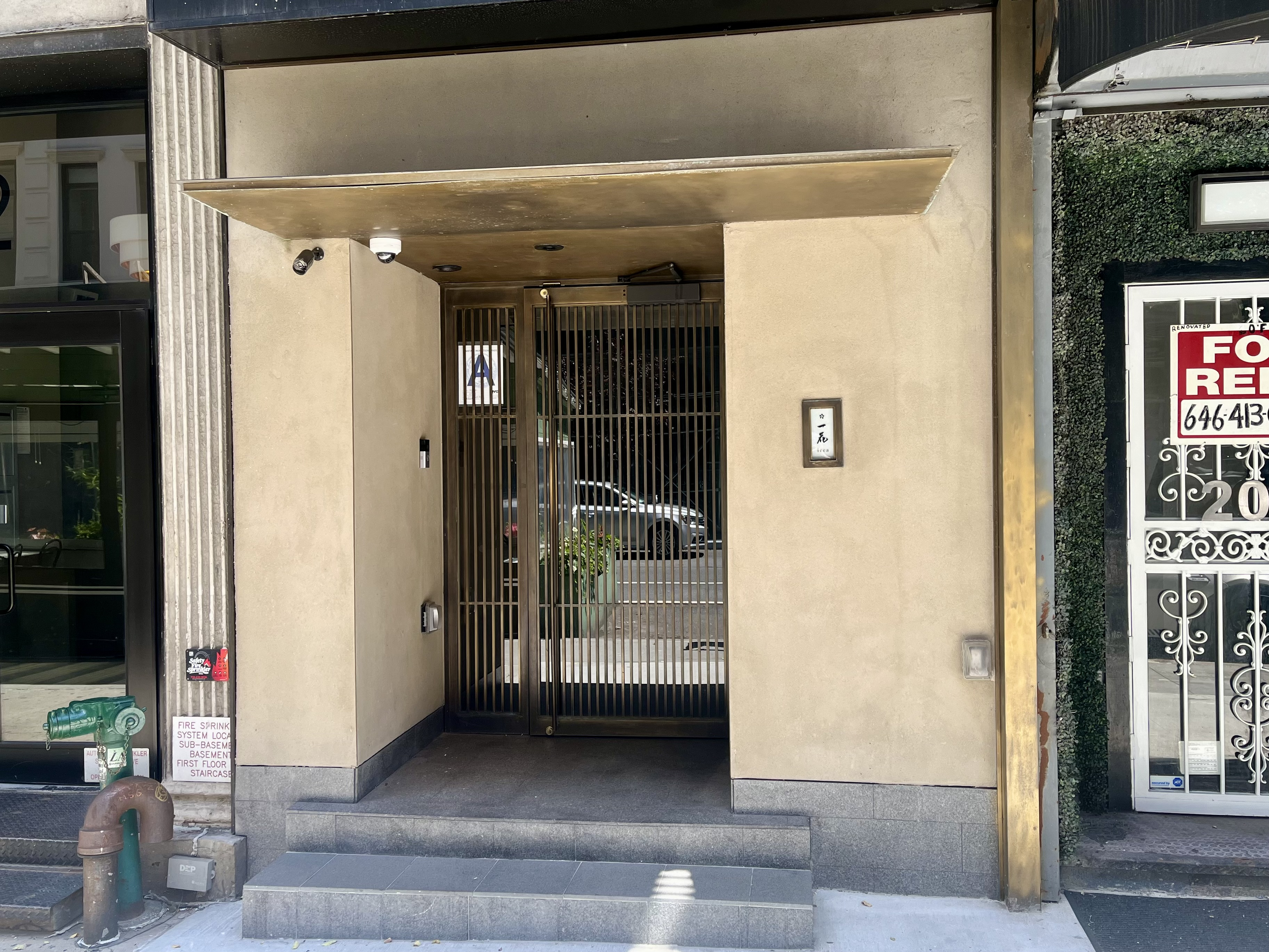
- The restaurant's exterior in 2024
- Interactive map of Icca

Restaurant information
- Established: October 2021
- Food type: Japanese
- Rating: (Michelin Guide)
- Location: 20 Warren Street, New York City, New York, 10007, United States
- Coordinates: 40°42′51.2″N 74°0′28″W

Icca is a Japanese restaurant in New York City. Kazushige Suzuki is the chef. The restaurant serves sushi and has received a Michelin star.

== See also ==
- List of Japanese restaurants
- List of Michelin-starred restaurants in New York City
