= Shota Omakase =

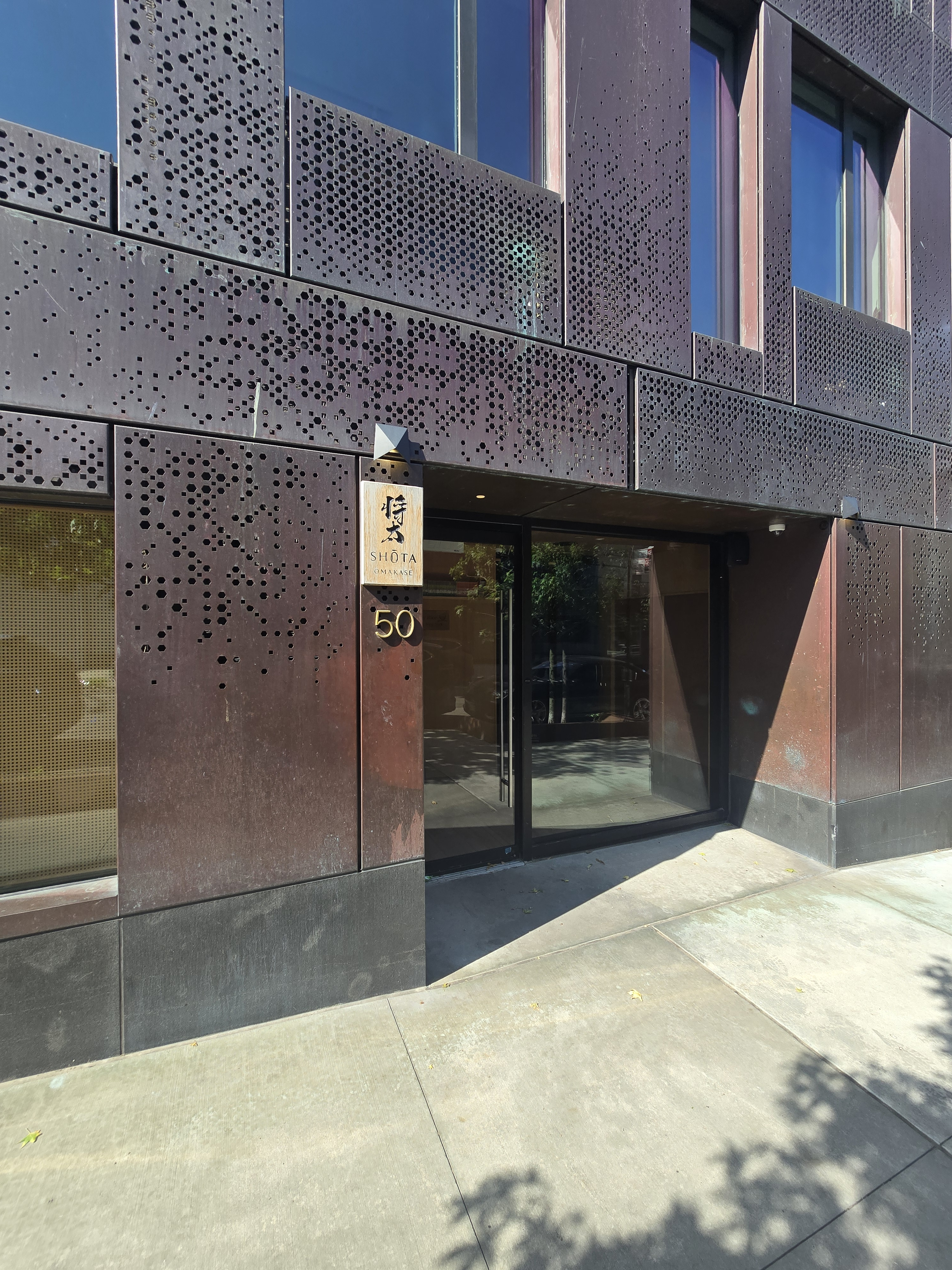
- The entrance to Shota Omakase
- Interactive map of Shota Omakase

Restaurant information
- Established: August 18, 2023
- Rating: 1 Michelin star
- Location: 50 South 3rd Street, Brooklyn, New York, 11249, United States
- Coordinates: 40.7136°N 73.9662°W

Shota Omakase is a Michelin-starred Japanese restaurant in Brooklyn, New York, United States. The restaurant opened on August 18, 2023.

== See also ==
- List of Japanese restaurants
- List of Michelin-starred restaurants in New York City
