= Yamada (restaurant) =

Japanese restaurant in New York City, U.S.

- Interactive map of Yamada

Restaurant information
- Established: 2 April 2025
- Food type: Japanese
- Rating: (Michelin Guide)
- Location: 16 Elizabeth Street, New York, New York, United States
- Coordinates: 40°42′57″N 73°59′50″W

Yamada is a Michelin-starred Japanese restaurant in the Chinatown neighborhood of Manhattan in New York City. The restaurant opened on 2 April 2025.

== See also ==
- List of Japanese restaurants
- List of Michelin-starred restaurants in New York City
