= Kurumazushi =

Japanese restaurant in New York City, U.S.

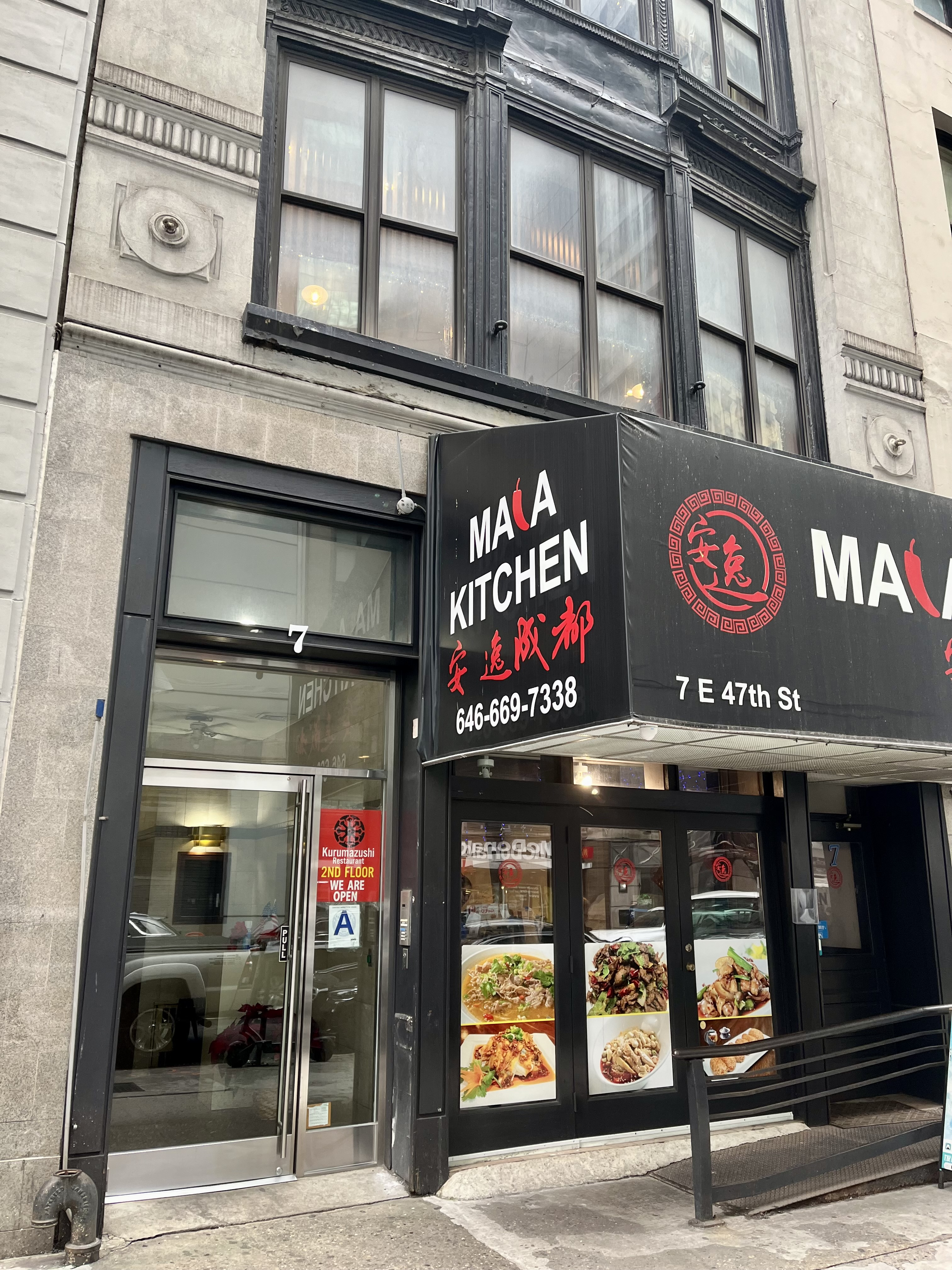
- The restaurant's exterior in 2024
- Interactive map of Kurumazushi

Restaurant information
- Established: 1977
- Food type: Japanese
- Location: 7 East 47th Street, New York City, New York, 10017, United States
- Coordinates: 40°45′23″N 73°58′40″W

Kurumazushi is a Japanese restaurant in New York City. The restaurant has received a Michelin star.

== See also ==
- List of Japanese restaurants
- List of Michelin-starred restaurants in New York City
