= Itsumono =

Defunct Japanese restaurant in Seattle, Washington, U.S.

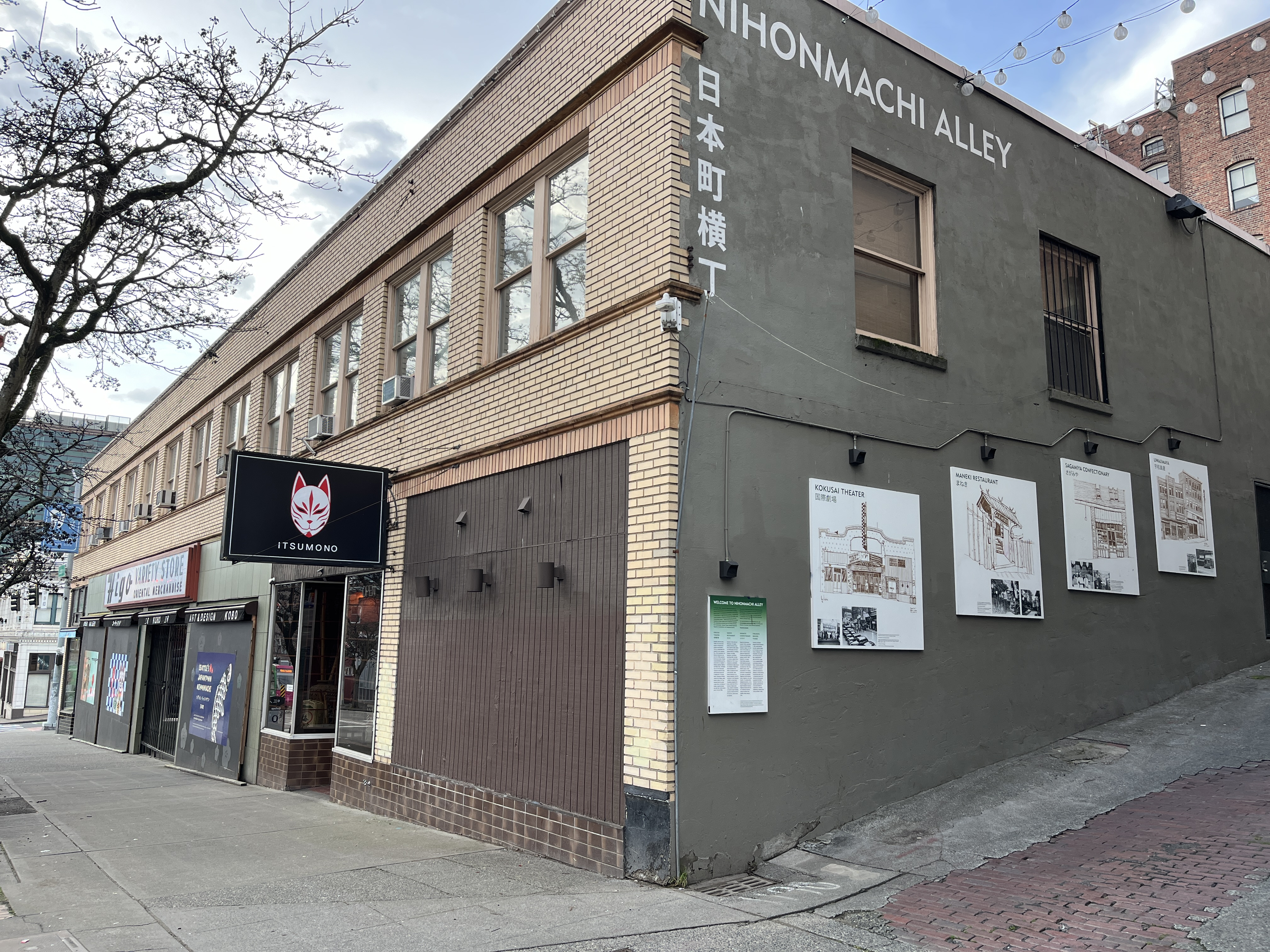
- The restaurant's exterior, 2024
- Interactive map of Itsumono

Restaurant information
- Owners: Mike Vu; Hisato Kawaminami
- Food type: Japanese
- Location: 610 South Jackson Street, Seattle, King, Washington, 98104, United States
- Coordinates: 47.5994°N 122.3258°W

Itsumono was a Japanese restaurant in Seattle, in the U.S. state of Washington. It opened in 2020 and closed permanently in 2026.

== Description ==
Itsumono was a Japanese gastropub in the Japantown part of Seattle's Chinatown–International District. The menu included Scotch egg, tonkatsu in tikka masala curry, and oysters.

== History ==
The restaurant was owned by Mike Vu and Hisato Kawaminami. It occupied the space that previously housed Kaname Izakaya. The restaurant opened in 2020 and closed permanently in 2026.

== Reception ==
In 2023, the business was included in The New York Times' list of Seattle's 25 best restaurants. Itsumono was included in The Infatuation's 2025 list of the 25 best restaurants in the Chinatown–International District.

== See also ==
- List of defunct restaurants of the United States
- List of Japanese restaurants
