= Okuda (restaurant) =

Defunct Japanese restaurant in New York City, U.S.

- Interactive map of Okuda

Restaurant information
- Established: 2017
- Closed: 2021
- Food type: Japanese
- Location: 458 West 17th Street, New York City, New York, 10011, United States
- Coordinates: 40°44′37.9″N 74°0′23.5″W

Okuda was a Japanese restaurant in New York City. The restaurant had received a Michelin star.

== See also ==
- List of defunct restaurants of the United States
- List of Japanese restaurants
- List of Michelin-starred restaurants in New York City
