= Sushi Inoue =

Japanese restaurant in New York City, U.S.

- Interactive map of Sushi Inoue

Restaurant information
- Established: 2015
- Owner: Shinichi Inoue
- Food type: Japanese
- Location: 381 Lenox Avenue, New York City, New York, United States
- Coordinates: 40.81061°N 73.94389°W
- Website: www.sushiinoue.net

Sushi Inoue was a Japanese restaurant in New York City. The restaurant has received a Michelin star. The restaurant closed unexpectedly in December 2020 due to the COVID-19 pandemic. It was the first Harlem-based restaurant to be awarded a Michelin star.

== See also ==
- List of Japanese restaurants
- List of Michelin-starred restaurants in New York City
