= Ushiwakamaru (restaurant) =

Japanese restaurant in New York City, U.S.

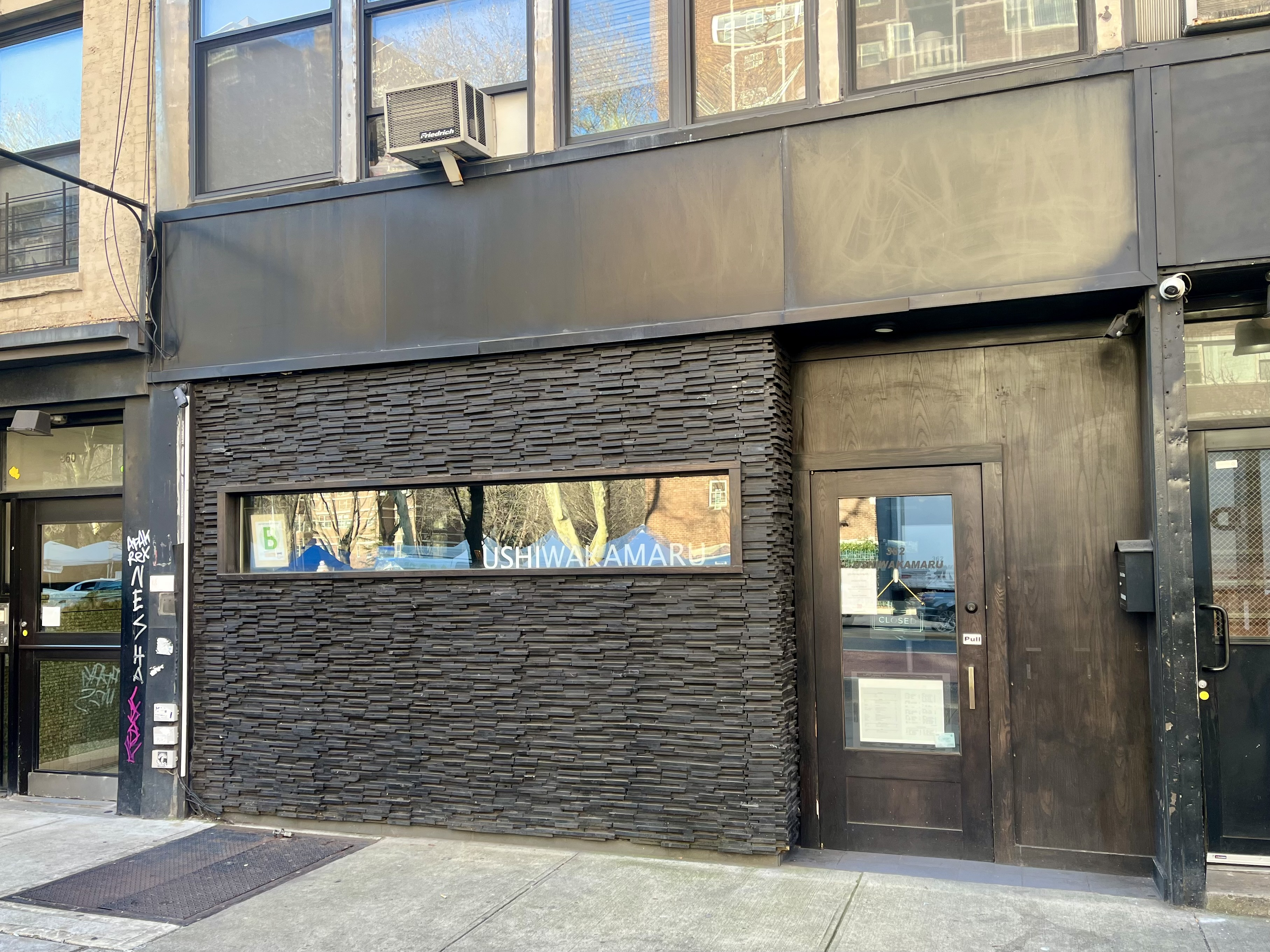
- Ushiwakamaru in December 2023
- Interactive map of Ushiwakamaru

Restaurant information
- Food type: Japanese
- Location: 362 West 23rd Street, New York City, New York, 10011, United States
- Coordinates: 40°44′46″N 74°00′04″W

Ushiwakamaru is a Japanese restaurant in New York City. The restaurant has received a Michelin star.

== See also ==
- List of Japanese restaurants
- List of Michelin-starred restaurants in New York City
