= Noz 17 =

Japanese restaurant in New York City

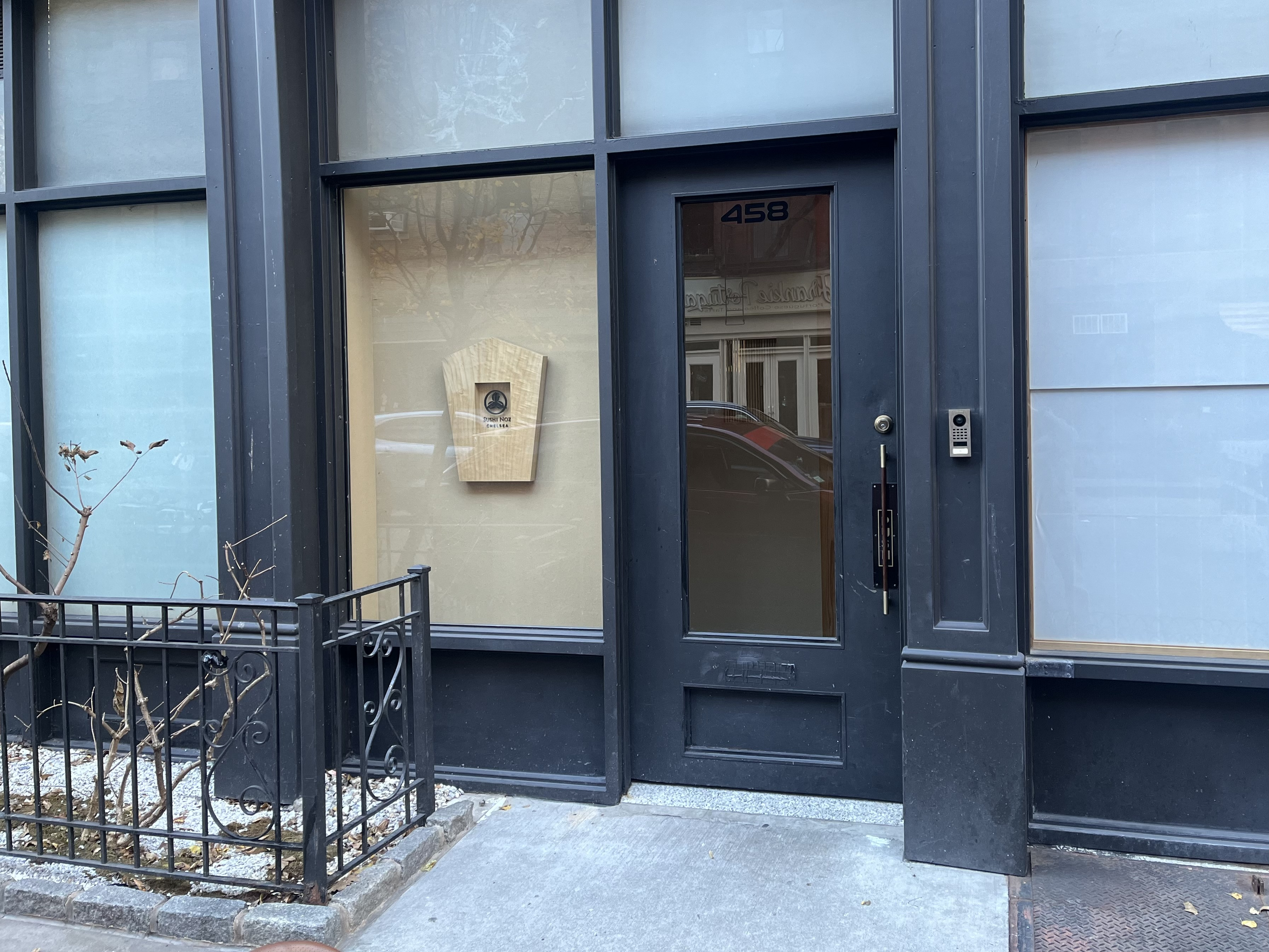
- Noz 17 in December 2023
- Interactive map of Noz 17

Restaurant information
- Head chef: Junichi Matsuzaki
- Food type: Japanese Omakase
- Dress code: No
- Rating: Michelin Guide
- Location: 458 West 17th Street, New York City, New York, 10011, United States
- Coordinates: 40°44′37.9″N 74°0′23.5″W
- Seating capacity: 7
- Reservations: Required
- Website: Official website

Noz 17 is a Japanese restaurant in New York City. The restaurant opened in 2021 and has received a Michelin star.

== See also ==
- List of Japanese restaurants
- List of Michelin-starred restaurants in New York City
