= Torien =

Japanese restaurant in New York City

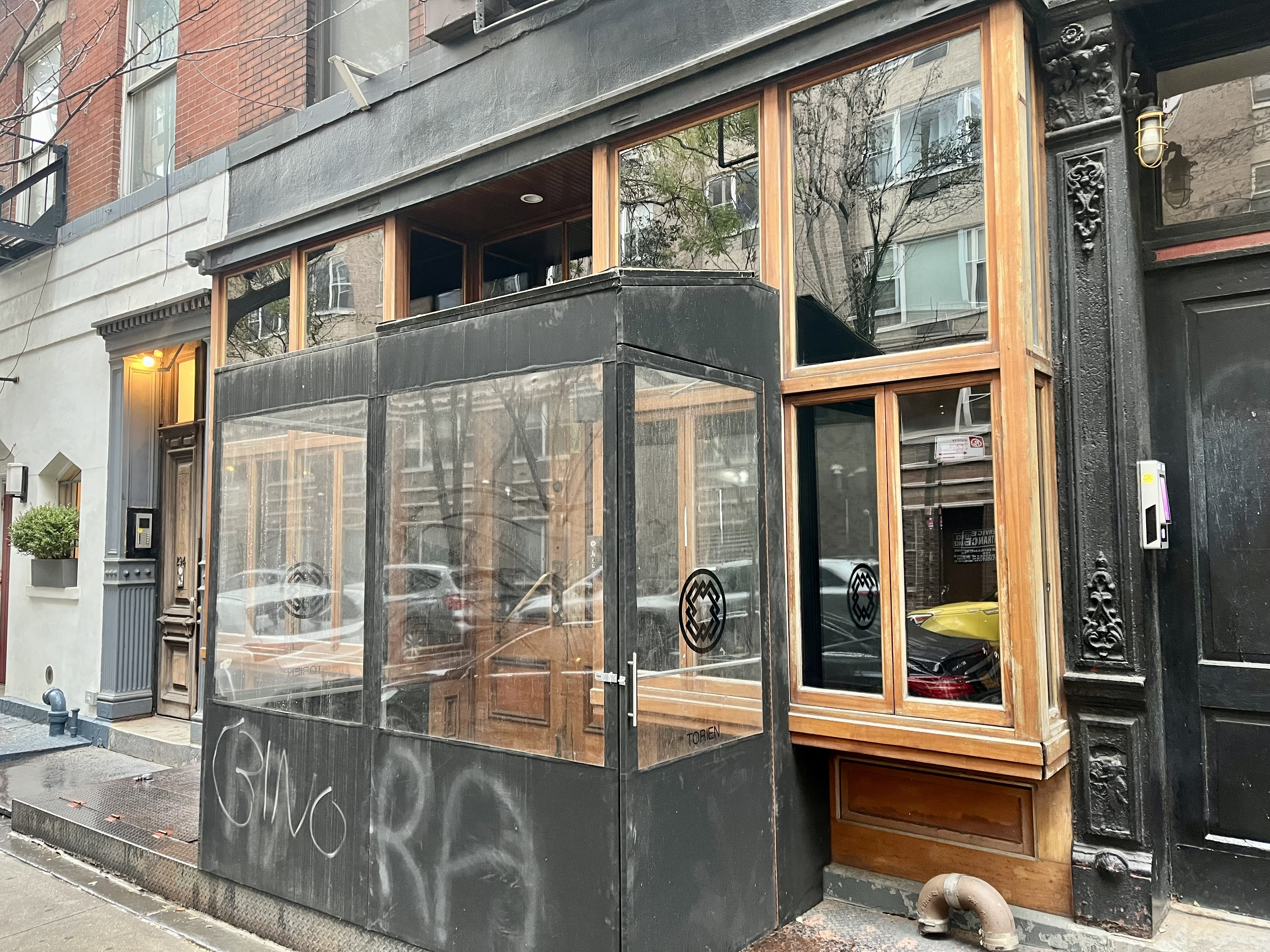
- Torien in December 2023
- Interactive map of Torien

Restaurant information
- Established: January 2020
- Food type: Japanese
- Rating: (Michelin Guide)
- Location: 292 Elizabeth Street, New York City, New York, 10012, United States
- Coordinates: 40°43′29.3″N 73°59′35.6″W
- Website: torien-nyc.com

Torien is a Japanese restaurant in the NoHo neighborhood of Manhattan in New York City. The restaurant has received a Michelin star.

== See also ==
- List of Japanese restaurants
- List of Michelin-starred restaurants in New York City
