= Yess (restaurant) =

Japanese restaurant in Los Angeles, California, U.S.

- Interactive map of Yess

Restaurant information
- Established: May 2023; 3 years ago
- Food type: Japanese
- Location: 2001 East 7th Street, Los Angeles, California, 90021, United States
- Coordinates: 34°2′5″N 118°13′56″W

Yess is a Japanese restaurant in Los Angeles, California. Established in May 2023, the business was included in The New York Times's 2023 list of the 50 best restaurants in the United States.

== See also ==
- List of Japanese restaurants
