= Shizuku by Chef Naoko =

Defunct Japanese restaurant in Portland, Oregon, U.S.

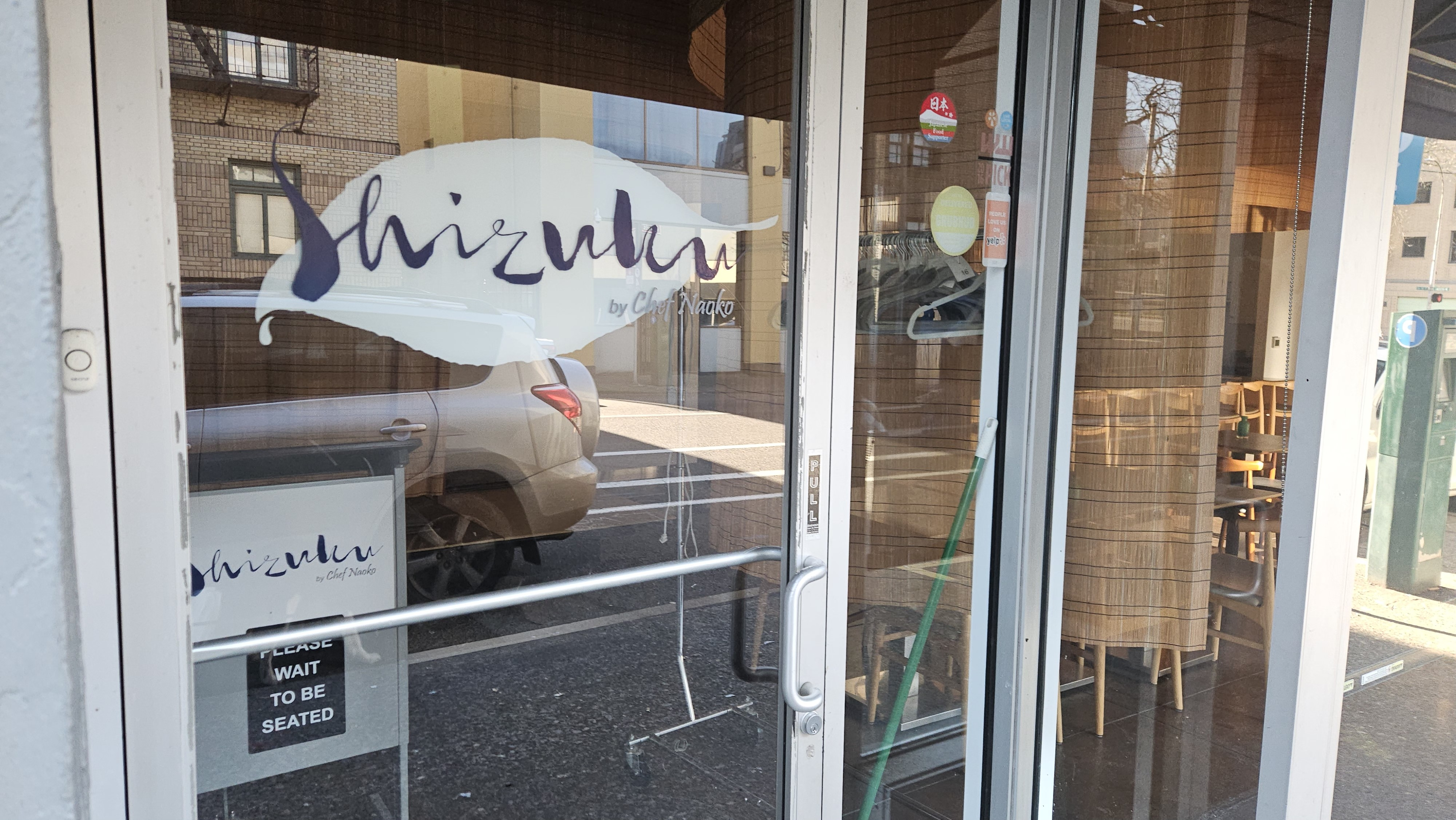
- Interactive map of Shizuku by Chef Naoko

Restaurant information
- Closed: June 23, 2023
- Owner: Naoko Tamura
- Chef: Naoko Tamura
- Food type: Japanese
- Location: 1235 Southwest Jefferson Street, Portland, Oregon, 97201, United States
- Coordinates: 45.5168°N 122.6869°W
- Website: shizukupdx.com

Shizuku by Chef Naoko was a Japanese restaurant in Portland, Oregon. Chef and owner Naoko Tamura opened Chef Naoko in 2007 and rebranded the business to Shizuku by Chef Naoko in 2017. The rebrand accompanied a redesign by Japanese architect Kengo Kuma. The restaurant earned Tamura a James Beard Foundation Award nomination in the Best Chef: Northwest and Pacific category in 2020. Tamura announced the restaurant's permanent closure in 2023.

== Description ==
Shizuku by Chef Naoko was a Japanese restaurant on Southwest Jefferson Street in Portland. Alex Frane of Eater Portland described the restaurant as a "beautiful space that hovers between traditional and contemporary Japanese design, and that honors the food served at Shizuku". Willamette Week's Matthew Korfhage called the space "an ethereal world of sunlight and undulating bamboo screens".

An umami lunch was launched in 2018; udon options included a tonkatsu pork loin hot sandwich. The restaurant also served bentos, onigiri, and tamagoyaki.

== History ==
Chef and owner Naoko Tamura opened Chef Naoko in 2007. The restaurant was rebranded to Shizuku by Chef Naoko and redesigned by Kengo Kuma in 2017. In February 2018, Shizuku closed temporarily to convert to a omakase format.

Shizuku closed temporarily during the summer of 2022 to "reorganize ... operations around the many post-pandemic challenges" and set up a "new format". The restaurant re-opened for takeout service in January 2023. In June 2023, Tamura announced plans to close Shizuku permanently on June 23.

== Reception ==
The restaurant won the Design of the Year category at Eater Portland's annual Eater Awards in 2017. In 2020, the business earned Naoko a James Beard Foundation Award nomination in the Best Chef: Northwest and Pacific category.

== See also ==
- List of Japanese restaurants
