= Tsukimi (restaurant) =

Japanese restaurant in New York City

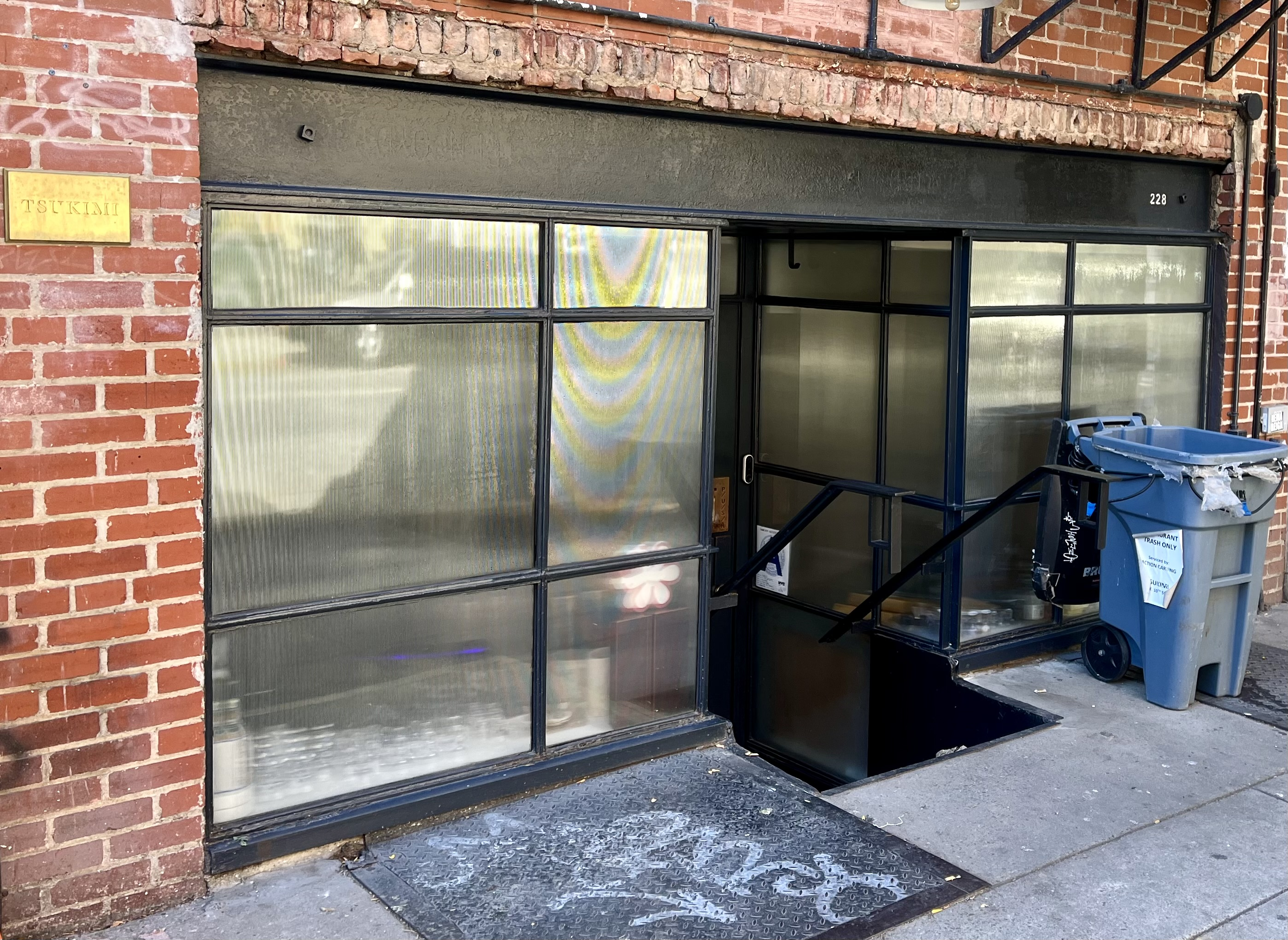
- The restaurant's exterior in 2025
- Interactive map of Tsukimi

Restaurant information
- Established: June 2019
- Head chef: Takanori Akiyama
- Food type: Japanese
- Rating: (Michelin Guide)
- Location: 228 East 10th Street, New York City, New York, United States
- Coordinates: 40°43′45″N 73°59′07″W
- Seating capacity: 12-seat counter
- Reservations: Required
- Website: tsukimi.nyc

Tsukimi is a Michelin-starred Japanese restaurant in the East Village neighborhood of Manhattan in New York City. The restaurant opened in June 2019.

== See also ==
- List of Japanese restaurants
- List of Michelin-starred restaurants in New York City
