= 15 East =

Japanese restaurant in New York City

15 East at Tocqueville

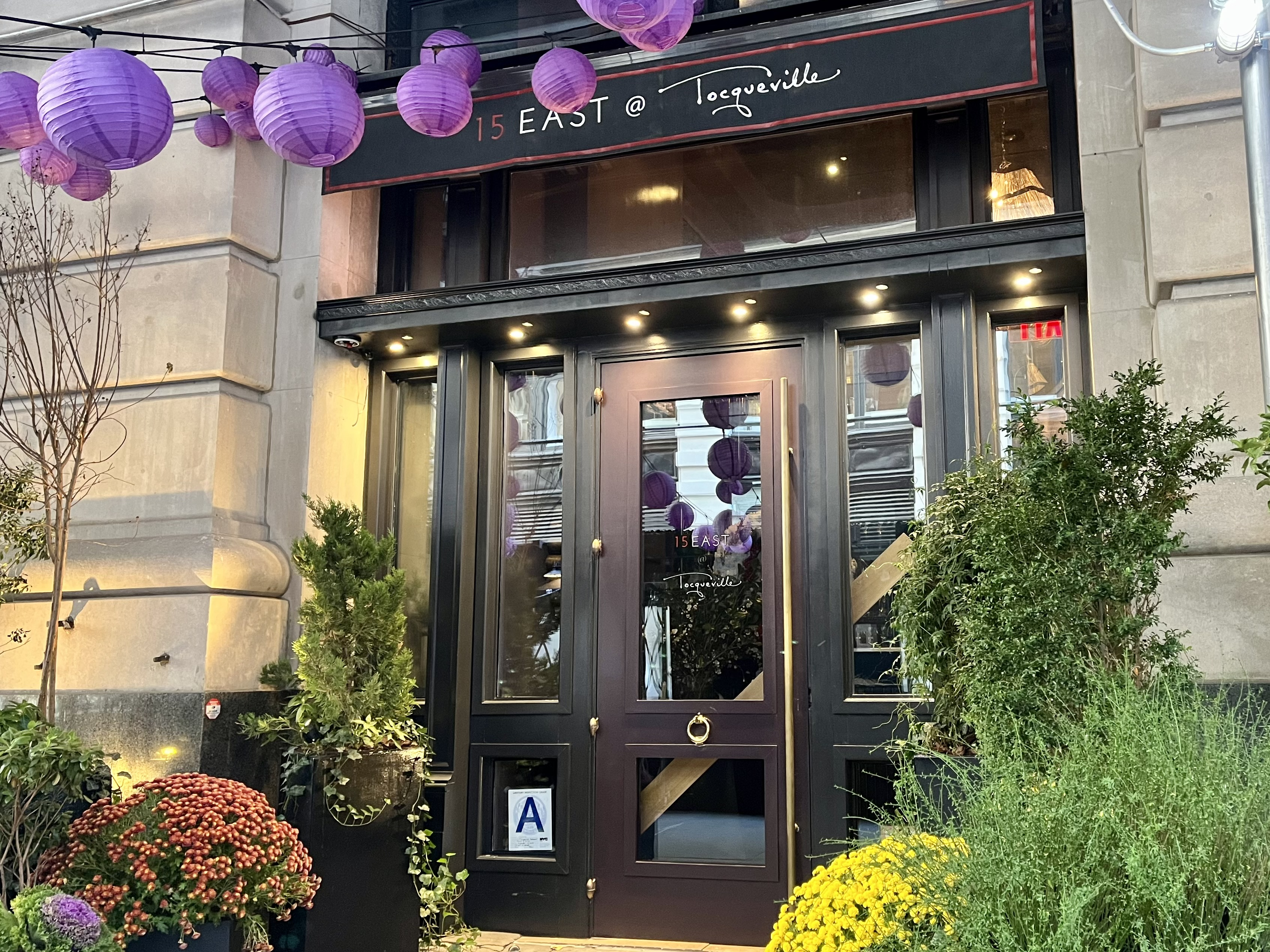
- 15 East in November 2023
- Interactive map of 15 East at Tocqueville

Restaurant information
- Established: October 2020
- Owner: Marco Moreira
- Head chef: Marco Moreira
- Food type: Japanese
- Dress code: Casual
- Location: 1 East 15th Street, New York City, New York, 10003, United States
- Coordinates: 40°44′11.9″N 73°59′33.6″W
- Website: Official website

15 East (also known as 15 East at Tocqueville) is a French-inspired Japanese restaurant at 1 East 15th Street in Union Square, Manhattan, New York City. The restaurant has received a Michelin star, but lost it in 2016.

== See also ==
- List of Japanese restaurants
- List of Michelin-starred restaurants in New York City
