= Ltd Edition Sushi =

Restaurant in Seattle, Washington, U.S.

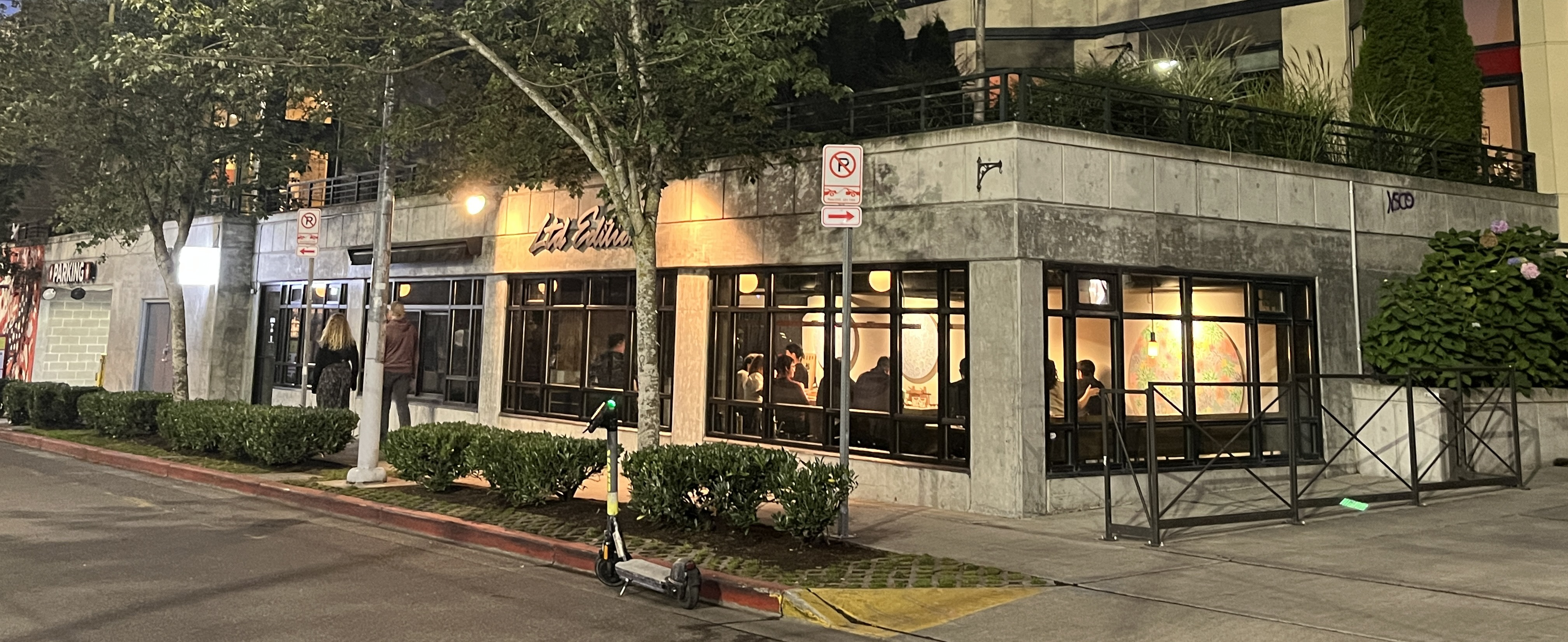
- The restaurant's exterior, 2023
- Interactive map of Ltd Edition Sushi

Restaurant information
- Food type: Japanese
- Location: 1641 Nagle Place, Seattle, Washington, 98122, United States
- Coordinates: 47°36′57.7″N 122°19′13.2″W

Ltd Edition Sushi is a Japanese restaurant in Seattle, Washington. Established in July 2021, the business was included in The New York Times's 2023 list of the 50 best restaurants in the United States. The Capitol Hill restaurant has a seating capacity of 10 people.

== Reception ==
The business was included in Eater Seattle's 2025 overview of the best restaurants on Capitol Hill.

== See also ==
- List of Japanese restaurants
