= Odo (restaurant) =

Japanese restaurant in New York City

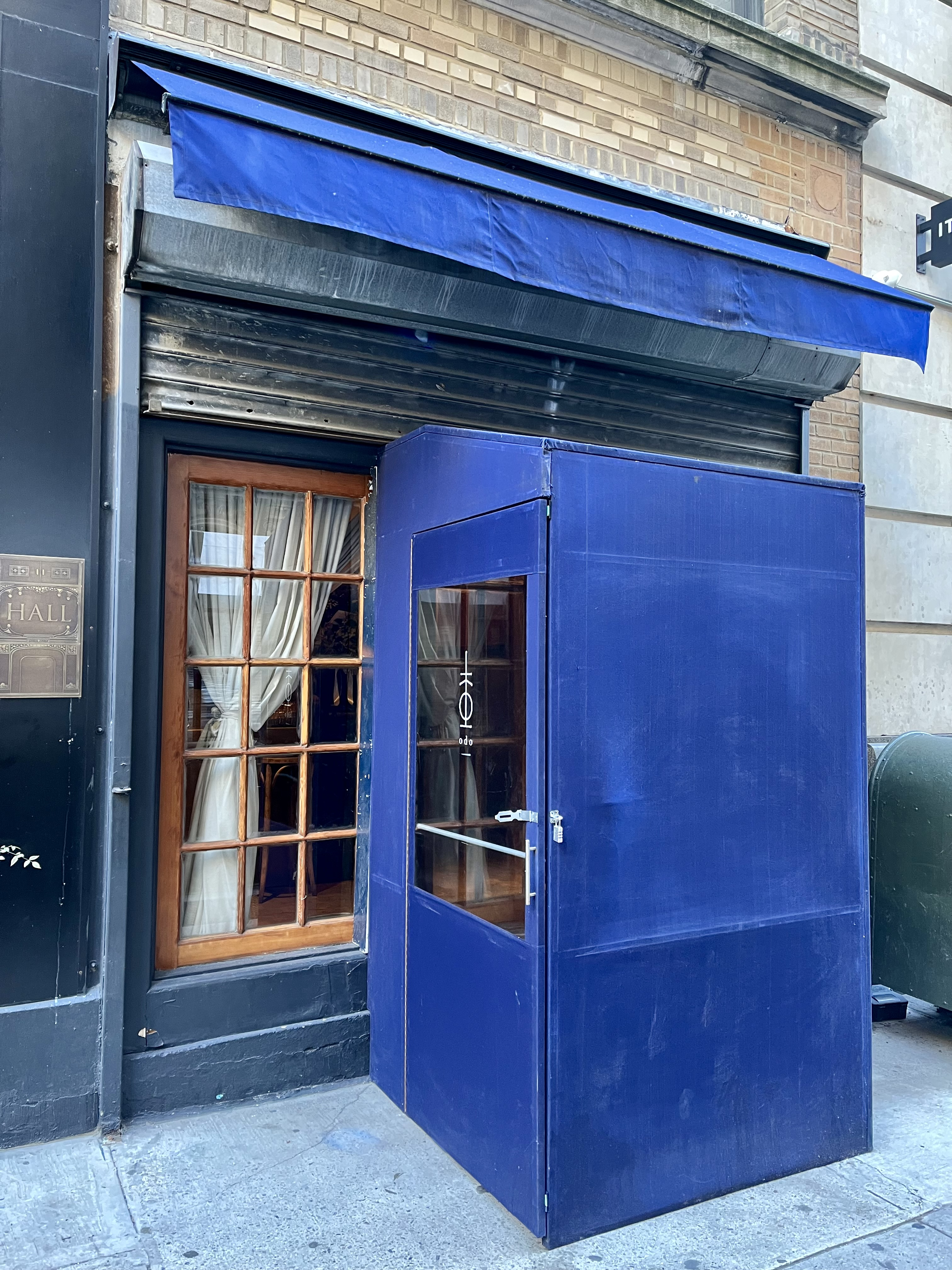
- Odo in November 2023
- Interactive map of Odo

Restaurant information
- Established: December 2018
- Head chef: Hiroki Odo
- Food type: Japanese
- Rating: (Michelin Guide)
- Location: 17 West 20th Street, New York City, New York, 10011
- Coordinates: 40°44′25.5″N 73°59′32″W
- Website: www.odo.nyc

Odo is a Japanese restaurant in the Flatiron District of Manhattan in New York City led by head chef Hiroki Odo. The restaurant has received two Michelin stars.

== See also ==
- List of Japanese restaurants
- List of Michelin-starred restaurants in New York City
