= Bar Miller =

- Interactive map of Bar Miller

Restaurant information
- Established: September 27, 2023
- Owners: Jeff Miller and TJ Provenzano
- Head chef: James Dumapit
- Chef: Jeff Miller
- Food type: Omakase (Japanese)
- Rating: (Michelin Guide 2024)
- Location: 620 East 6th Street, New York City, New York, 10009, United States
- Coordinates: 40.724°N 73.9808°W
- Website: www.barmiller.com

Bar Miller is a Michelin-starred Japanese restaurant located in the neighborhood of Alphabet City across from Tompkins Square Park in New York City. The restaurant opened on September 27, 2023, and serves a 15-course omakase with Japanese and American preparations. Compared to other omakase within the city, the restaurant concentrates on sustainable seafood serving only American fish. The restaurant is next door to their more casual spot Rosella, which also has the same sustainable seafood practice.

== See also ==
- List of Japanese restaurants
- List of Michelin-starred restaurants in New York City
