= Tofuya Ukai =

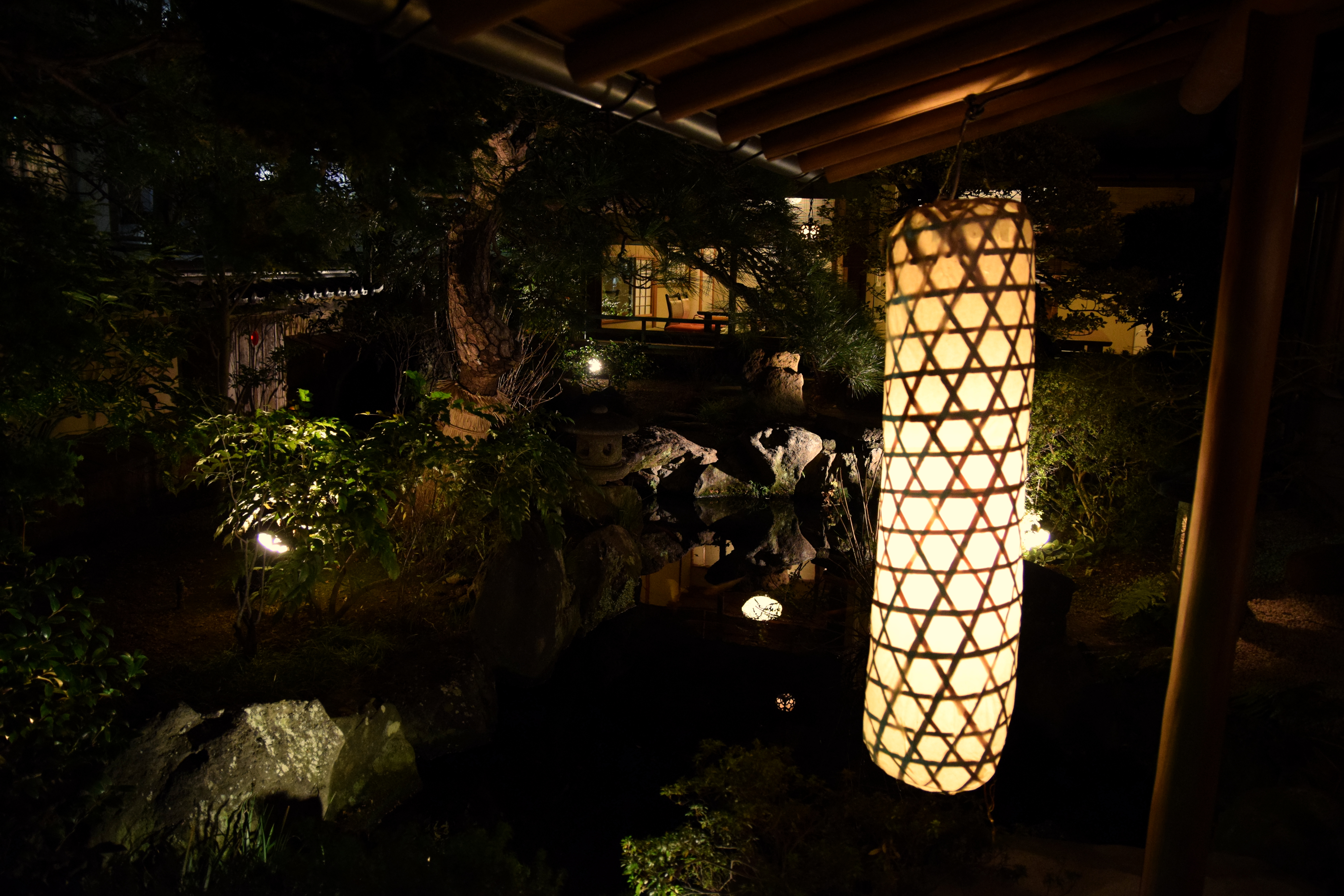
- Tofuya Ukai at night in 2016
- Interactive map of Tofuya Ukai

Restaurant information
- Established: 2005
- Owner: Ukai group
- Head chef: Takeshi Kikuchi
- Food type: Japanese, tofu
- Location: 4-4-13 Shiba-koen, Minato-ku, Tokyo, Minato, Tokyo, 105-0011, Japan
- Coordinates: 35°39′26.74″N 139°44′43.38″E 35.65742835048912, 139.74538535296645
- Reservations: Required
- Website: www.ukai.co.jp/english/shiba/

Tofuya Ukai is a luxury tofu restaurant in Minato, Tokyo, located near Tokyo Tower. It is part of the Ukai group chain of restaurants.

== Building and ambience ==
The restaurant is inspired from the Edo period and includes a traditional Japanese garden with Japanese maple trees (Momiji), a waterfall and a carp pond. Tofuya Ukai occupies the premises of a 200-year-old former sake brewery transplanted from Yonezawa, Yamagata Prefecture, and still keeps the sake brewing vats. Waitresses wear hakamas and guests seat on tatamis. The restaurant has 55 private rooms furnished in traditional zashiki-style with tatami mats, screens and windows with translucent paper, and leg wells under the table called horigotatsu.

According to architect Makoto Yamaguchi, Tofuya Ukai has Tokyo Tower as its shakkei, which means borrowed scenery or neighboring textures.

== Food ==
Dishes are served in the refined kaiseki style, full course traditional Japanese cuisine. Fresh tofu is delivered daily from its own workshop in the Okutama mountains, made from Hokkaido beans. Ukai offers a variety of seasonal tasting menus, including meat-based and vegetarian courses. The signature dish is warm tofu served in a dashi-seasoned soy milk.

== Reception ==
According to Condé Nast Traveler, Tofuya Ukai is: "A shrine to all things tofu, often rendered in ways you never imagined. A lunch here is delicious but lengthy—be prepared to spend at least three hours. The location—a traditional house with private tatami-floored rooms overlooking a carp pond—is as beautiful as the food". According to Butterfield & Robinson's The Slow Road Luxury Travel Blog, Tofuya Ukai is among Tokyo's best restaurants. The Lonely Planet guide describes Tofuya Ukai as "One of Tokyo's most gracious restaurants".

== See also ==
- List of Japanese restaurants
