= Cagen =

Japanese restaurant in New York City

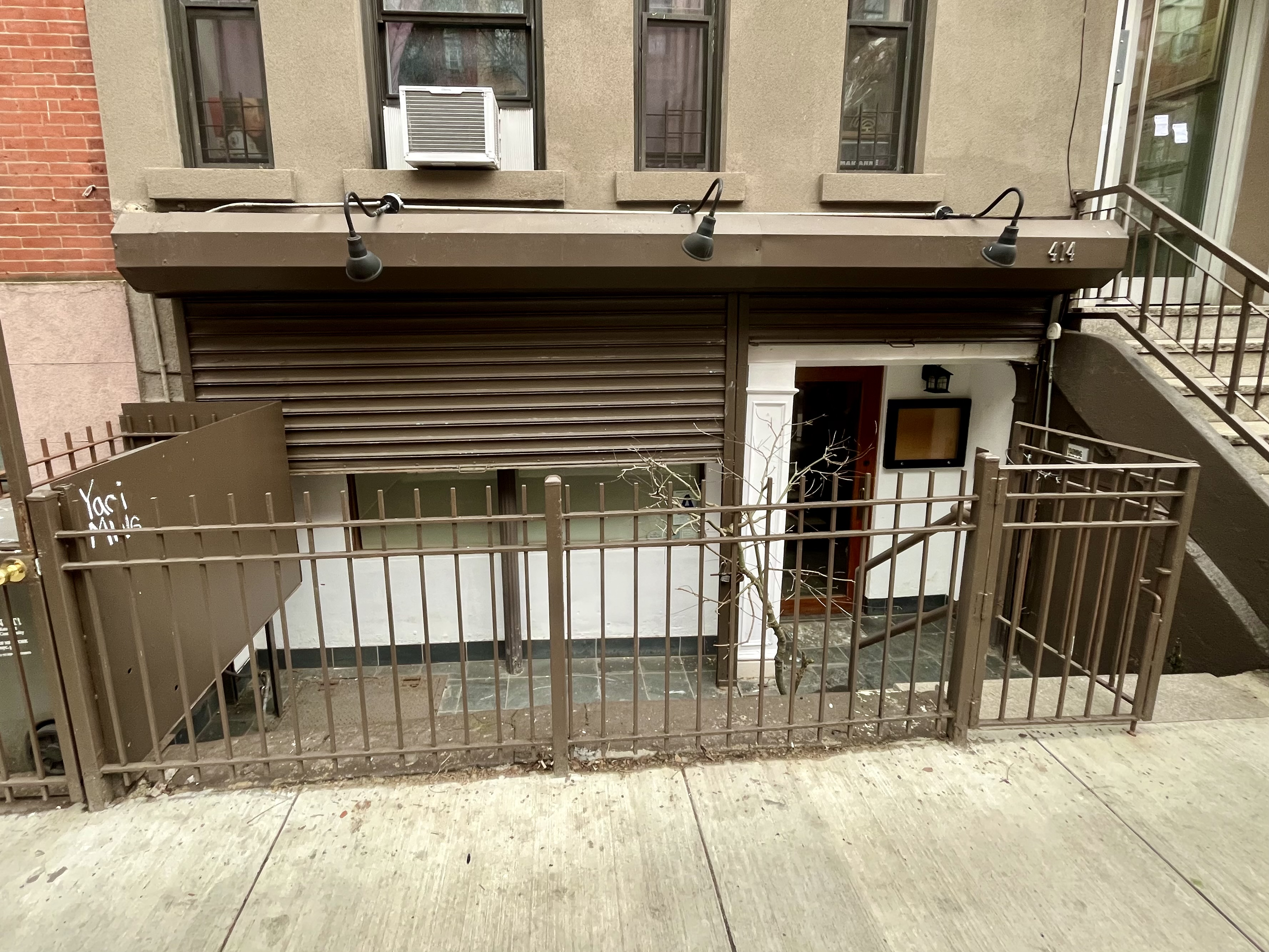
- The former location of Cagan in 2024
- Interactive map of Cagen

Restaurant information
- Established: 2013
- Closed: December 2023
- Food type: Japanese
- Location: 414 East 9th Street, New York City, New York, 10009, United States
- Coordinates: 40°43′40.1″N 73°59′3.1″W
- Website: Official website

Cagen was a Japanese restaurant in the East Village neighborhood of Manhattan in New York City. The restaurant had received a Michelin star. The restaurant closed in December 2023.

== See also ==
- List of Japanese restaurants
- List of Michelin-starred restaurants in New York City
