= Saburo's =

Sushi restaurant in Portland, Oregon, U.S.

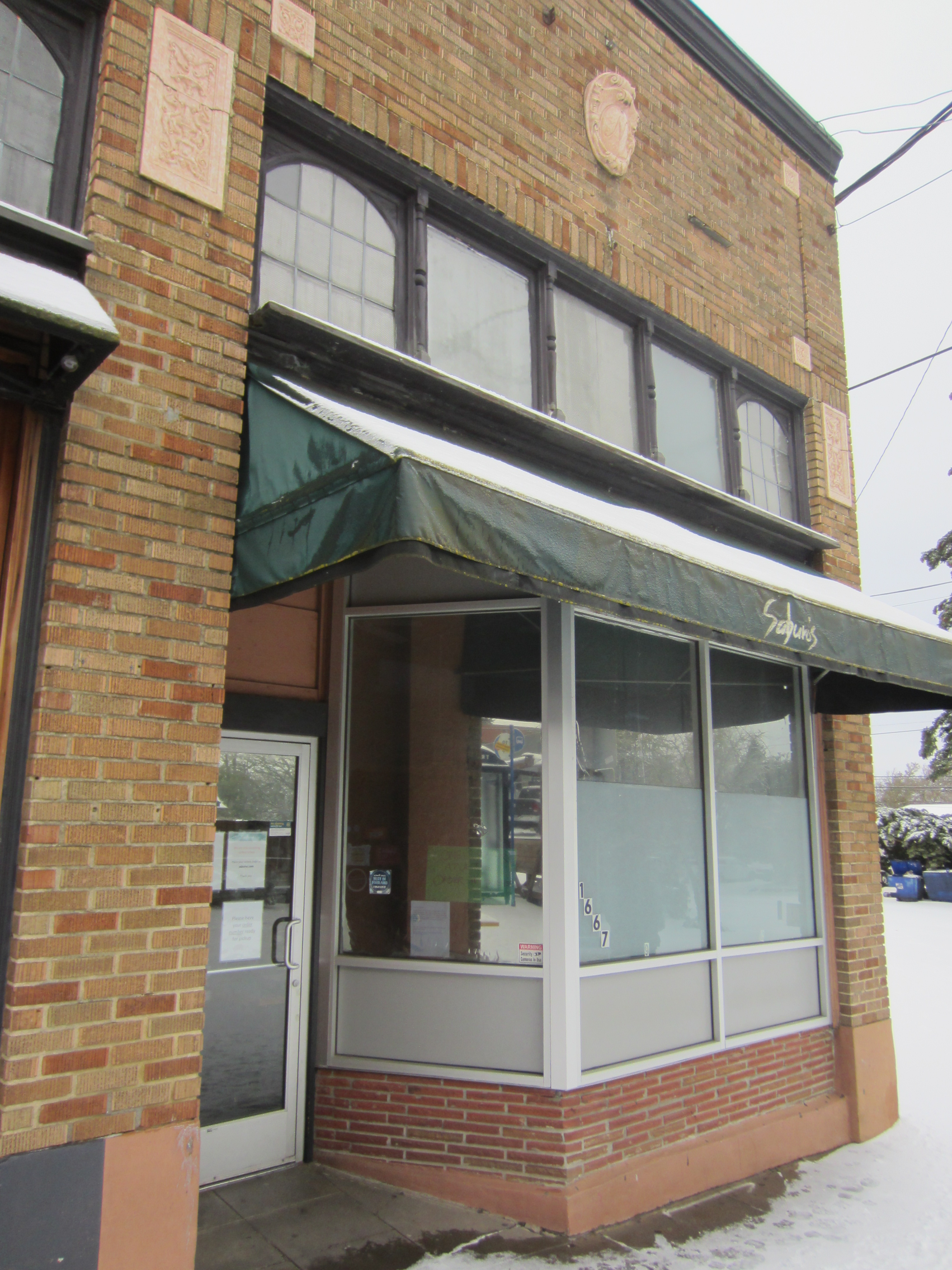
- The restaurant's exterior in 2021
- Interactive map of Saburo's

Restaurant information
- Food type: Japanese
- Location: Portland, Oregon, United States
- Coordinates: 45.4739°N 122.6485°W
- Website: saburos.com

Saburo's Sushi House Restaurant, or simply Saburo's, is a sushi restaurant in Portland, Oregon, United States.

== Description and reception ==
The 2010 guide Best Places: Portland says, "come here for no-frills, value sushi". In her book Food Lover's Guide to Portland, Liz Crain said Saburo's serves "big-ass" sushi. Portland Monthly says, "Rolls the size of Hondas will have you coming back to this popular Sellwood sushi joint. The albacore tuna, softshell crab, and sea urchin topped with quail egg yolk swim to the top of the list." In her Insiders' Guide to Portland, Oregon, Rachel Dresbeck wrote:

Serving good sushi in Portland, Saburo's popularity is evident by the crowds who gather outside in the evening, awaiting beautiful slices of velvety, firm fish and magnificent, fresh rolls. The sake list is also good, as are the tempura, noodles, and other traditional dishes. We order these because we can't help it, and they are good, but the true attraction is the sushi. The lighting is bright and the tables are tiny and crowded. There are always long lines, so we have been known to write out names on the list and then sneak up the street for a cocktail.

In 2016, Saburo's ranked third in the Best Sushi category of Willamette Week's annual reader's poll. Michael Russell ranked Saburo's number 9 in The Oregonian's 2018 list of Portland's top ten sushi restaurants, writing: "The raw fish might not be quite at the level as some of the restaurants later on this list, but the Japanese lagers are cold, the nigiri are as big as your fist and the vibe is great at this popular Sellwood sushi spot." Alex Frane included Saburo's in Eater Portland's 2019 overview of "Where to Imbibe and Dine in Sellwood and Westmoreland".

== See also ==
- List of Japanese restaurants
- List of sushi restaurants
