= Yoshino (restaurant) =

Japanese restaurant in New York City, US

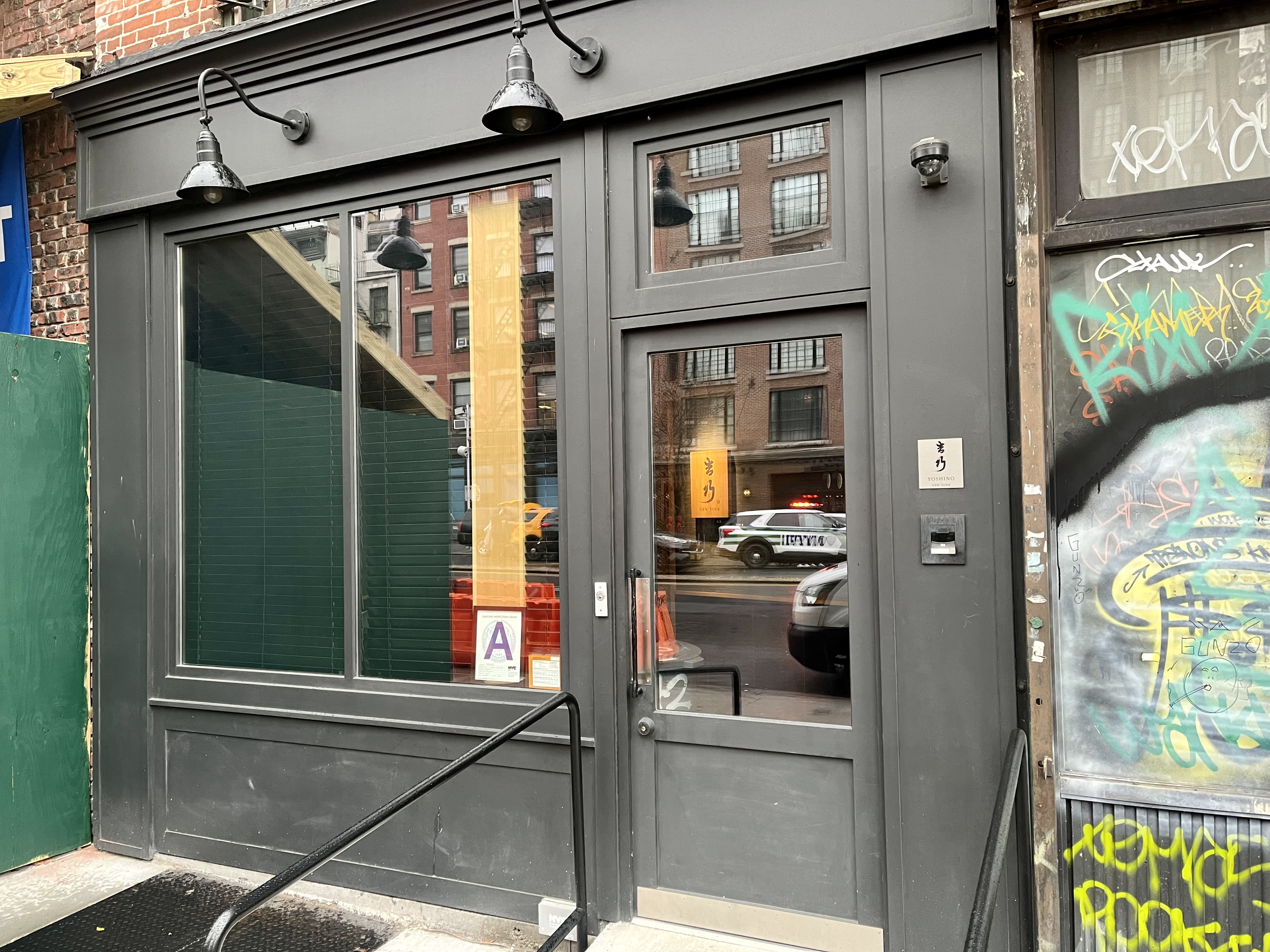
- Yoshino in December 2023
- Interactive map of Yoshino

Restaurant information
- Established: September 23, 2021
- Owners: Andrew Gyokudari, Jean Dupuy, and Paul Dupuy
- Head chef: Tadashi Yoshida
- Food type: Sushi
- Rating: Michelin Guide:; Best Restaurant in North America (OAD 2025); Best Sushi Restaurant in North America (OAD 2023, 2024, 2025); 4 Stars (NY Times Review)
- Location: 342 Bowery, New York City, New York, 10003, United States
- Coordinates: 40°43′34.4″N 73°59′31.6″W
- Seating capacity: 10
- Reservations: Required
- Website: yoshinonewyork.com

Yoshino is a Japanese restaurant in New York City serving sushi omakase by head chef Tadashi Yoshida. Yoshino was one of the top three sushi restaurants in Japan according to Tabelog as of 2017 when it decided to shut down its Nagoya restaurant and move to Tokyo by teaming up with Andrew Gyokudari, a restaurateur and former sushi chef. Yoshino relocated to New York and opened in 2021.

== See also ==
- List of Japanese restaurants
- List of Michelin-starred restaurants in New York City
