= Florilège =

Japanese Michelin-star restaurant

Restaurant information
- Established: 2009 (17 years ago)
- Head chef: Hiroyasu Kawate
- Food type: Sustainable food
- Rating: Michelin Guide
- Location: Tokyo, Japan
- Website: www.aoyama-florilege.jp

Florilège is a Japanese restaurant based in Tokyo serving French-Japanese cuisine. It was opened in 2009 by chef Hiroyasu Kawate. It has an open kitchen that allows guests to watch their dishes being made. It is currently #36 on the World's 50 Best Restaurants. It was ranked #2 on Asia's 50 Best Restaurant 2024 list.

It received two Michelin Stars in 2018 and also a Michelin Green Star.
