= Koni Store =

Brazilian chain of Japanese cuisine restaurants

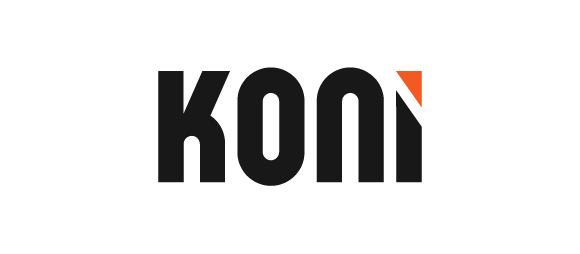

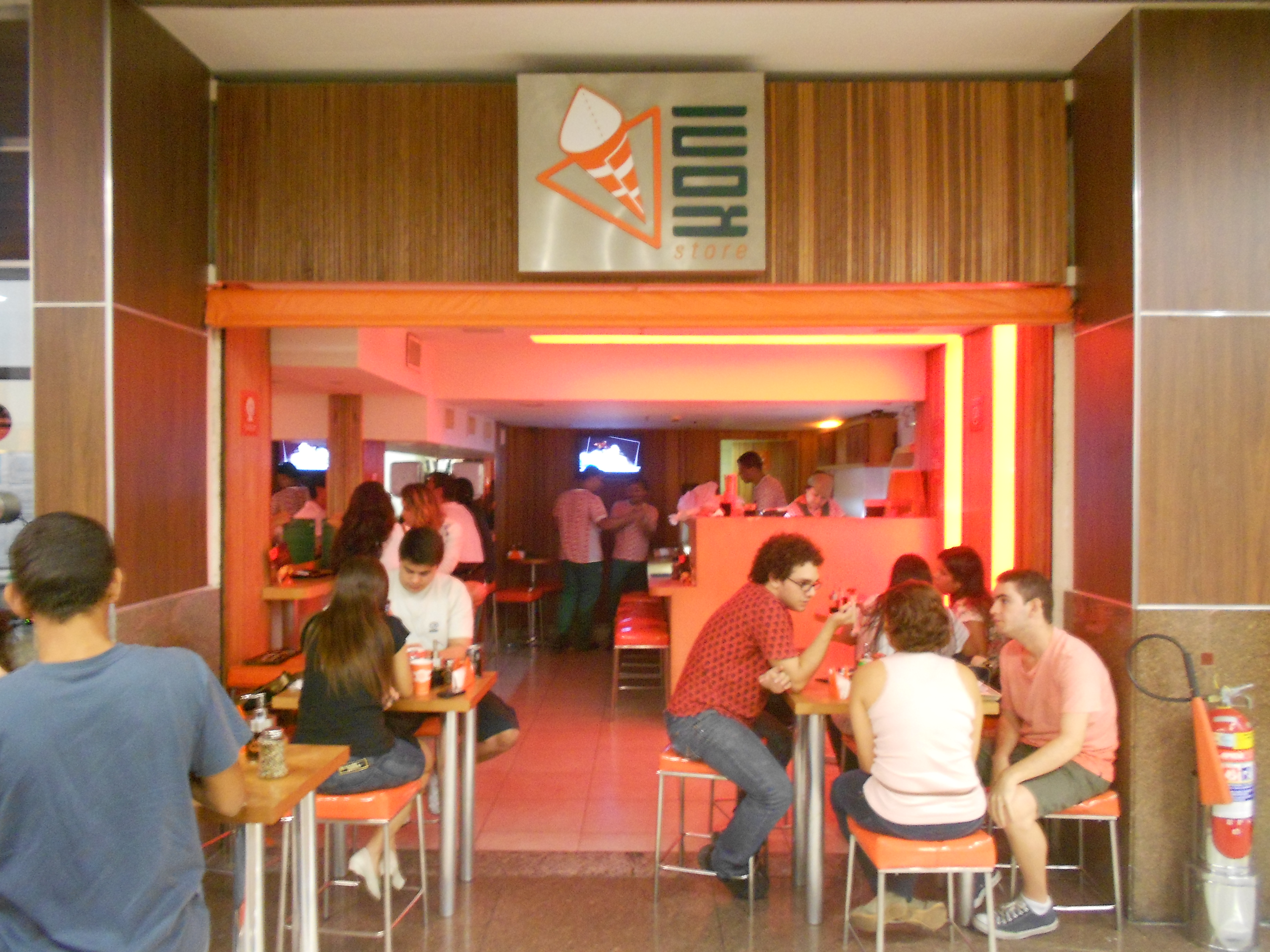
- Company type: Private
- Industry: Restaurants
- Founded: Rio de Janeiro, Brazil 2006; 20 years ago
- Headquarters: Rio de Janeiro, Brazil
- Products: Japanese food;Fast Food
- Website: www.koni.com.br, www.konistore.pt

Koni Store is a Brazilian chain of Japanese food outlets headquartered in Rio de Janeiro. Its restaurants sell popular Japanese cuisine-based dishes, such as temakis and sushi, but operates with a fast food logistic and layout. Currently, Koni has 32 stores located in four Brazilian states and the Federal District. Being easy to find in major cities within those states, Koni has become a very popular chain in Brazil, and was cited in a New York Times article, which said university students "have elevated it to a post-clubbing snack on a par with pizza."

In 2010, Koni Store opened the first restaurant abroad in Lisbon, Portugal in the upscale neighborhood of Chiado. In December 2011, this store closed.
