= Sushi Sho =

Sushi restaurant in New York City

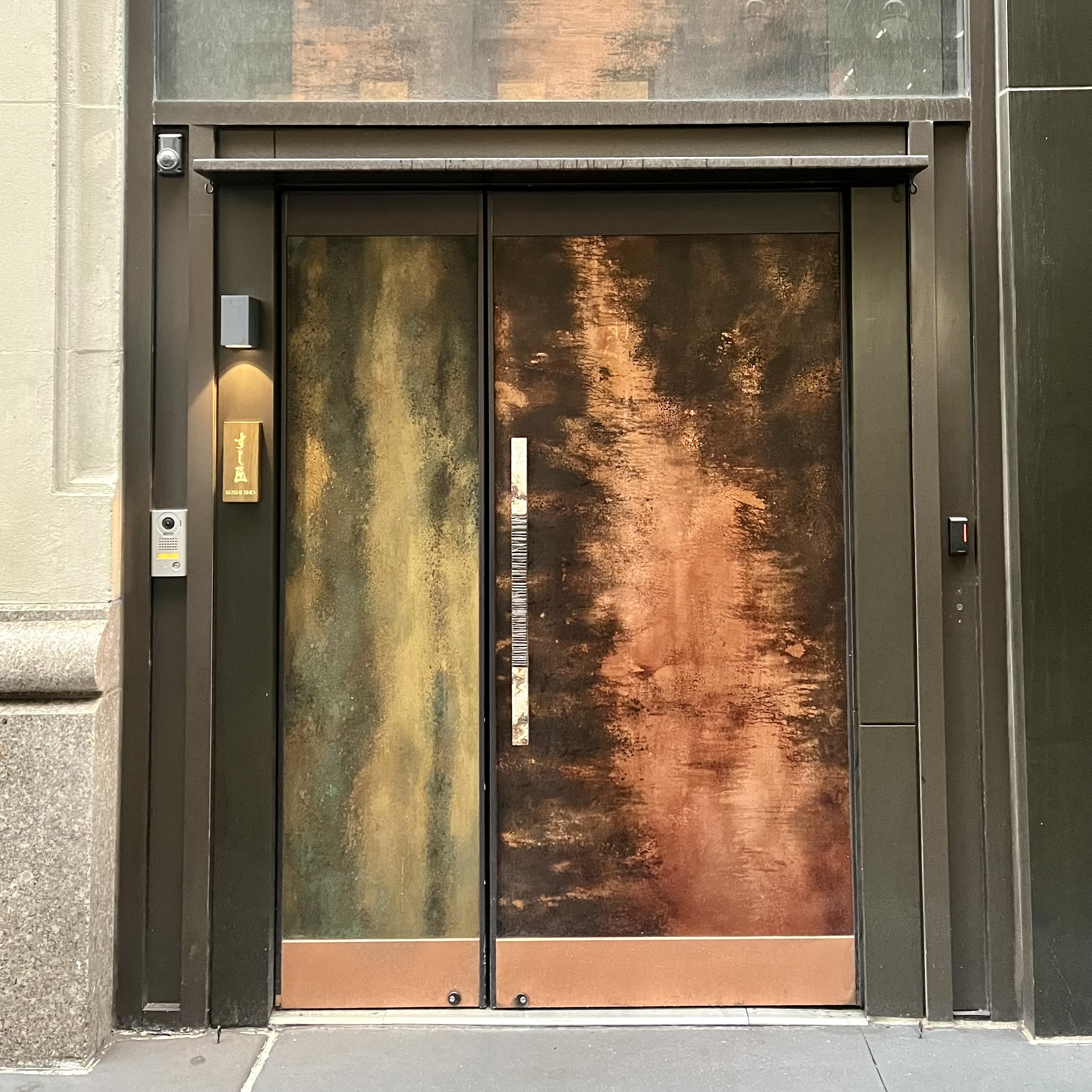
- The restaurant's exterior in 2025
- Interactive map of Sushi Sho

Restaurant information
- Established: March 1, 2024
- Head chef: Keiji Nakazawa
- Food type: Omakase sushi
- Rating: Michelin Guide: stars (2024) stars (2025-); The New York Times: 2 of 4 stars, #8 in top 100 in 2025
- Location: 3 East 41st Street, New York City, New York, 10017, United States
- Coordinates: 40°45′09″N 73°58′51″W
- Seating capacity: 10
- Reservations: Required via Tock
- Website: https://www.exploretock.com/sushi-sho-nyc

Sushi Sho is a Michelin-starred Japanese restaurant in Midtown East, New York City near Bryant Park by chef Keiji Nakazawa. They serve sushi in an omakase in traditional Edomae style. The restaurant opened on March 1, 2024, and quickly earned 2 Michelin stars before earning their third Michelin Star in the 2025 Michelin Awards. Sushi Sho, therefore, became the first sushi restaurant in New York to earn 3 stars since Masa. The restaurant, which seats 10, has two seatings a night and offers extra courses along with their omakase listed as "Okonomi."

== See also ==
- List of Japanese restaurants
- List of Michelin 3-star restaurants in the United States
- List of Michelin-starred restaurants in New York City
- List of sushi restaurants
