= Tanuki (restaurant) =

Defunct restaurant and bar in Portland, Oregon, U.S.

- Interactive map of Tanuki

Restaurant information
- Established: 2008
- Closed: 2019
- Owner: Janis Martin
- Chef: Janis Martin
- Food type: Japanese
- Location: 8029 Southeast Stark Street, Portland, Oregon, 97215, United States
- Coordinates: 45.5192°N 122.5808°W

Tanuki was a Japanese restaurant and bar in Portland, Oregon, United States. The business operated from 2008 to 2019.

== Description ==
The Japanese restaurant Tanuki initially operated on 21st Avenue at Flanders Street in northwest Portland's Northwest District, before relocating to the Montavilla neighborhood in 2011. Erin DeJesus described the original space as a "hole-in-the-wall". Signs at the Montavilla space said "No sushi, no kids" and "This is not a Japanese restaurant".

The menu included gyoza, sashimi, kimchi, and oshinko. Tanuki also served fermented noodles, trout in a seaweed butter sauce, kimchi macaroni and cheese, duck heart, various seafood dishes, and buns with kimchi, blue cheese, and sake-cured bacon. The bar stocked Asian beers, sake, shōchū, and Japanese whisky. Among cocktails was the Dejima, which had Damrak gin, St. Germain, and rhubarb bitters.

== History ==
The restaurant opened on 21st Avenue in 2008. Janis Martin was the chef and owner. In 2011, the restaurant relocated to Stark Street in the southeast Portland part of the Montavilla neighborhood. Tanuki began restricting seating in 2013. Suffering from a seafood allergy, Martin closed Tanuki permanently in 2019 and began working at East Glisan Pizza Lounge.

== Reception ==
In 2012, Karen Brooks and Rachel Ritchie included Tanuki in Portland Monthly's "Best of the Rest", a list of 35 local eateries "that should remain in any food lover's regular rotation". Brooks later called the restaurant the city's "notorious cult izakaya". In 2016, Time Out included Tanuki in a list of the eighteen best Japanese restaurants in the United States. The business was included in Portland Monthly's 2025 list of 25 "restaurants that made Portland".

== See also ==
- List of Japanese restaurants
