= 180 Xurros =

Defunct restaurant in Portland, Oregon, U.S.

Restaurant information
- Established: 2016
- Owners: Cristina Baéz; José Chesa; David Martin
- Location: Portland, Oregon, United States

180 Xurros was a Barcelona-style churro restaurant (Catalan: xurreria) in Portland, Oregon, United States. Established in 2016, the business was the city's first churro shop. It operated on Broadway in northeast Portland for approximately two years, and later next to the restaurants Ataula and Masia.

== Description ==
180 Xurros specialized in xurros, a variant of churros from Catalonia. The business name was inspired by the temperature (in degrees Celsius) at the which the dough is fried to make the xurros. When the business opened on Broadway in northeast Portland, the main area's seating capacity was twelve people. 180 later operated next to the restaurants Ataula and Masia.

180's xurros were dusted with cinnamon and sugar; dipping sauces included caramel, lemon curd, marshmallow swirl, and roasted peanut. The menu also included xurros bañados (chocolate-covered xurros), xuixos (a doughnut-like pastry with a crema catalana filling), xurro ice cream sandwiches, and xocolata (milk with melted chocolate). For one ice cream pop-up in 2017, 180 offered select Salt & Straw varieties for its ice cream sandwiches, including Coava Coffee & Cocanú Craque. Chocolate from Cocanú was used for 180's drinking chocolates and ice cream.

== History ==
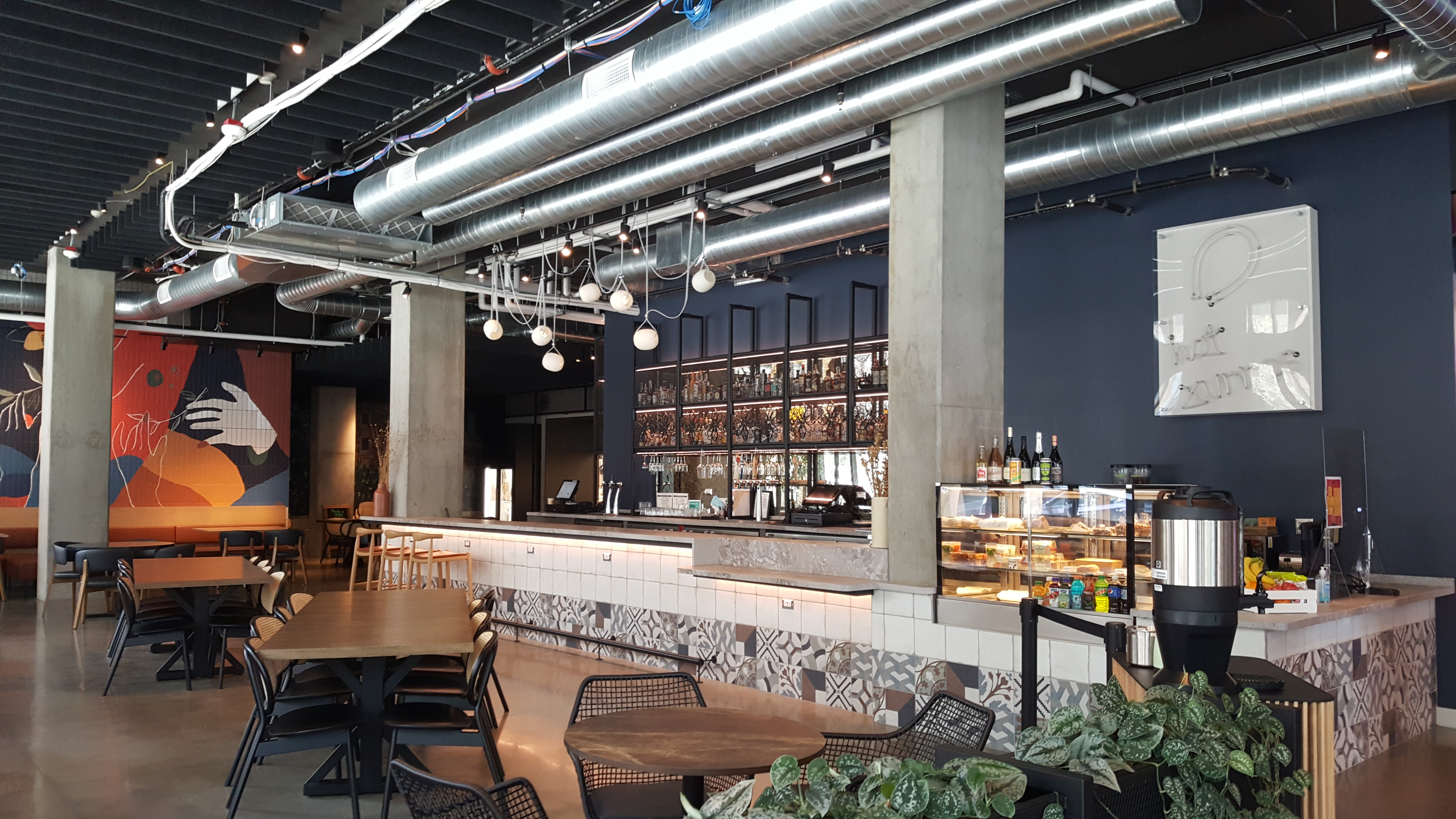
The restaurant Masia (interior pictured in 2021) served xurros from 180 Xurros.

180 Xurros opened on Broadway in 2016, as an extension of the restaurant Chesa. 180 has been described as Portland "first authentic churro shop". Spouses Cristina Baéz and José Chesa co-owned the business with David Martin. 180 began serving xurro ice cream sandwiches in 2017. For Valentine's Day in 2018, the restaurant sold xurro bonbons, or small xurros stuffed with raspberry cream, dipped in white chocolate, and dusted with 24k edible gold sugar. Later in the year, the business announced plans to move next to the couple's Catalan restaurant Ataula.

In 2019, the couple announced plans to serve 180's xurros at their new restaurant Masia, which operated in the Hyatt Centric Downtown Portland. In January 2020, 180 announced plans to start operating in a dedicated space of the hotel's lobby starting in February. The xurros were to be made in Masia's kitchen. The menu would also include buñuelos, chocolate chip cookies, croissants, xuixos, and flauta-like sandwiches on baguettes imported from Barcelona with ingredients such as confit tuna, jamón ibérico, manchego, and Spanish tortilla. Coffee was to be supplied by Never Coffee. Both 180 and Masia closed permanently as a result of the impact of the COVID-19 pandemic.

== Reception ==
In 2017, Kelly Clarke of Portland Monthly described the xurro ice cream sandwiches as "a crunchy, drippy, cinnamon-sugar sweet stunner that tastes like the refined, international cousin of an Oregon State Fair midway treat". In 2020, Micheal Russell of The Oregonian said of 180's two-year run on Broadway: "Though short-lived, it was among the most exciting things to happen to fried dough in Portland last decade."

== See also ==
- COVID-19 pandemic in Portland, Oregon
- Hispanics and Latinos in Portland, Oregon
- Impact of the COVID-19 pandemic on the food industry
- Impact of the COVID-19 pandemic on the restaurant industry in the United States
- List of defunct restaurants of the United States
- List of Spanish restaurants
