= The Paper Bridge =

Vietnamese restaurant in Portland, Oregon, U.S.

- Interactive map of The Paper Bridge

Restaurant information
- Established: November 9, 2023
- Owners: Quynh Nguyen; Carlo Reinardy
- Chef: Quynh Nguyen; Carlo Reinardy
- Food type: Vietnamese
- Location: 828 Southeast Ash Street, Portland, Multnomah, Oregon, 97214, United States
- Coordinates: 45.5214°N 122.6571°W
- Website: thepaperbridgepdx.com

The Paper Bridge is a Vietnamese restaurant in Portland, Oregon, United States. Spouses Quynh Nguyen and Carlo Reinardy, who are co-owners and co-chefs, opened the restaurant in southeast Portland in 2023.

== Description ==
The Paper Bridge is a Vietnamese restaurant in southeast Portland's Buckman neighborhood. The business is named after a district in Hanoi. The restaurant's dining room has two areas, one of which is referred to as "the garden" and has hanging plants and paper lanterns.

The Northern Vietnamese menu includes phở chiên phồng (fried rice noodles with a light gravy) as well as Vân Đình-style grilled duck with glass noodles, chive flowers, daylilies, and bamboo consomme. The restaurant also serves the noodle dish bún chả. Among pho varieties is one with roast duck leg. The Lang Son-style pho has barbecue pork, pork tenderloin, pork belly, fried sweet potato, and chile sauce. The charcuterie platter has pork hock, Vietnamese and lap xoung sausages, pate, floss made of shiitake, pickled morning glory, and cheche (a type of cheese).

Drink options include cà phê trung (egg coffee), iced coconut coffee, and rượu, or distilled rice wines infused with ingredients such as apple, mulberry, or rose myrtle. Cocktails include a gin fizz with calamansi juice and egg whites, and a mocktail called the lime snow has been described as "a sweet and citrusy confection with lots of ice". The Paper Bridge also serves smoothies with boba and jellies.

== History ==
The restaurant is co-owned by spouses Quynh Nguyen and Carlo Reinardy, who are also both chefs. It opened on November 9, 2023, in the space that previously housed Simpatica / La Luna cafe. The Paper Bridge operates in a building that also houses Bar Casa Vale and Scotch Lodge. For Lunar New Year in 2024, The Paper Bridge offered a special five-course dinner menu. The business had specials for the holiday again in 2025.

== Reception ==
Nick Woo and Krista Garcia included The Paper Bridge in Eater Portland's 2024 list of the city's seventeen "finest" Vietnamese restaurants. Michael Russell included the clams in The Oregonian's list of Portland's ten best dishes of 2024. The newspaper's Michael Russell included the business in a 2025 list of Portland's ten best new restaurants. The Paper Bridge was included in The New York Times's 2025 list of the fifty best restaurants in the U.S.

== See also ==
- List of Vietnamese restaurants
