= Masia (restaurant) =

Defunct restaurant in Portland, Oregon, U.S.

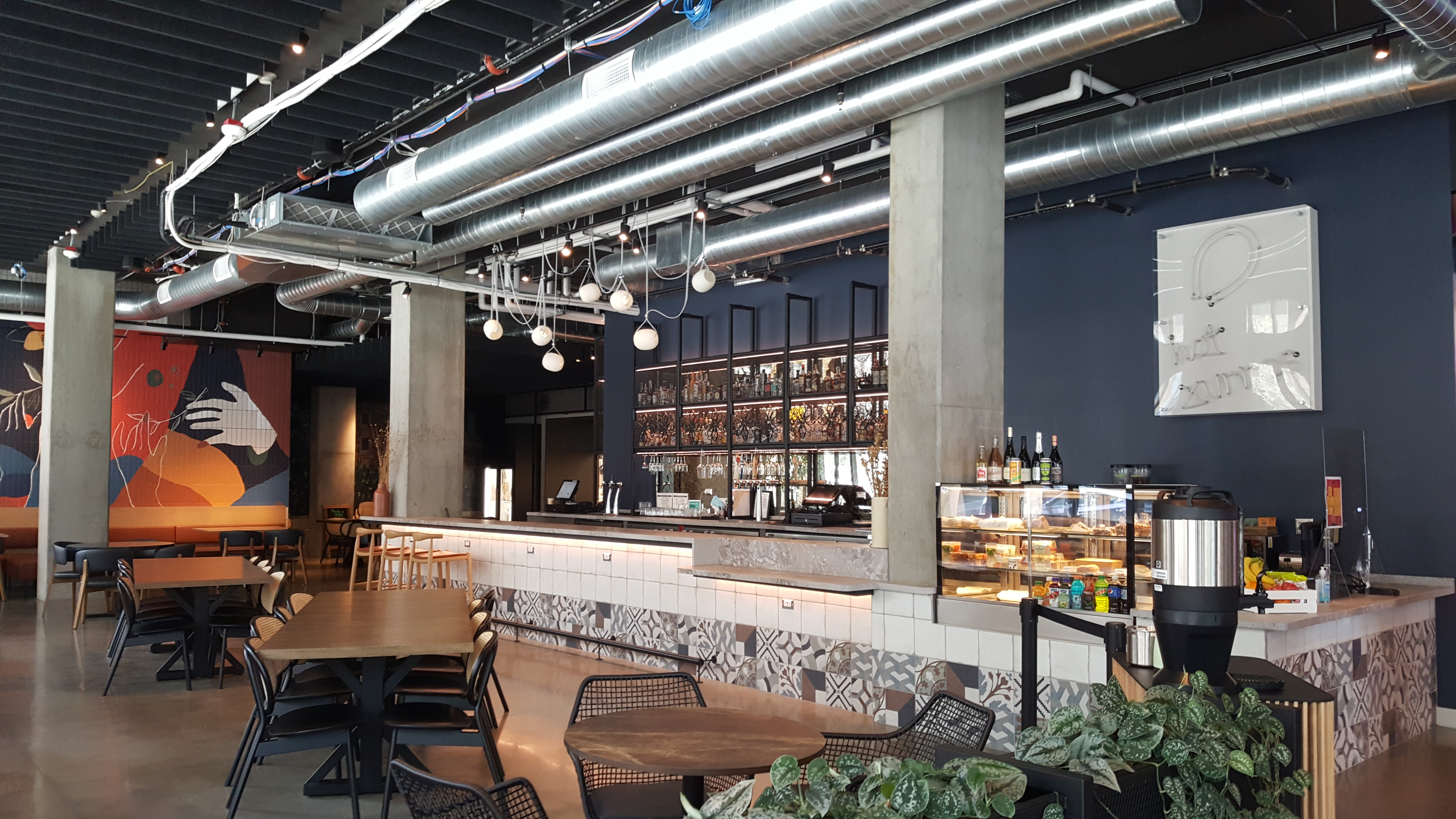
- The restaurant's interior in 2021
- Interactive map of Masia

Restaurant information
- Established: February 14, 2020
- Closed: March 31, 2021
- Owners: José Chesa; Cristina Baez; Emily Metivier
- Food type: Spanish; Catalan
- Location: 601 Southwest 11th Avenue, Portland, Multnomah, Oregon, 97205, United States
- Coordinates: 45.5209°N 122.6830°W

Masia was a short-lived Spanish and Catalan restaurant in Portland, Oregon, United States. Housed in the Hyatt Centric Downtown Portland, the restaurant was owned by married chefs José Chesa and Cristina Baez and their business partner, Emily Metivier. Shortly after opening with breakfast, lunch, and dinner service in February 2020, the COVID-19 pandemic forced Masia to close temporarily. The restaurant operated in various forms throughout the remainder of 2020, offering take-out service and special pre-packaged dinners for select holidays. The owners initially planned to close temporarily in January 2021 but confirmed the restaurant's permanent closure in March.

== Description ==
Masia was a 3,000-square-foot (280 m^{2}) Spanish and Catalan restaurant serving breakfast, lunch, and dinner in the Hyatt Centric in downtown Portland. The business was named after the type of rural construction of the same name, which is common in parts of Spain; the century-old masia built by restaurant co-owner José Chesa's grandfather in Aragon remains with the family. Inspired by these agrarian spaces, Chesa wanted the restaurant to commemorate his family as well as Portland's farmers and markets. According to Portland Monthly's Benjamin Tepler, Chesa also selected the name "to represent the restaurant's devotion to the hyper-local farm-to-table movement, but also a communal, familial ethos he hopes will resonate".

Eater Portland's Brooke Jackson-Glidden described Masia as "an expansive restaurant space with multiple murals and a lengthy bar", and Willamette Week said the "sleek" interior was "at once rural and thoroughly modern". Neutral-toned European tile was patterned to resemble 19th-century Spanish tile work, and murals by two local artists provided color accents. Jackson-Glidden described Ivy Campbell's artwork as "a sprawling, abstract mural of disembodied hands reaching for olive branches and leaves, over sunset tones and pops of dark blue". Erika Lee Sears' painting by the kitchen depicted a masia amidst green shrubbery. Masia's concrete dining room included multiple neon signs of jamón, a churro, and the text "hot xurros".

=== Menu ===
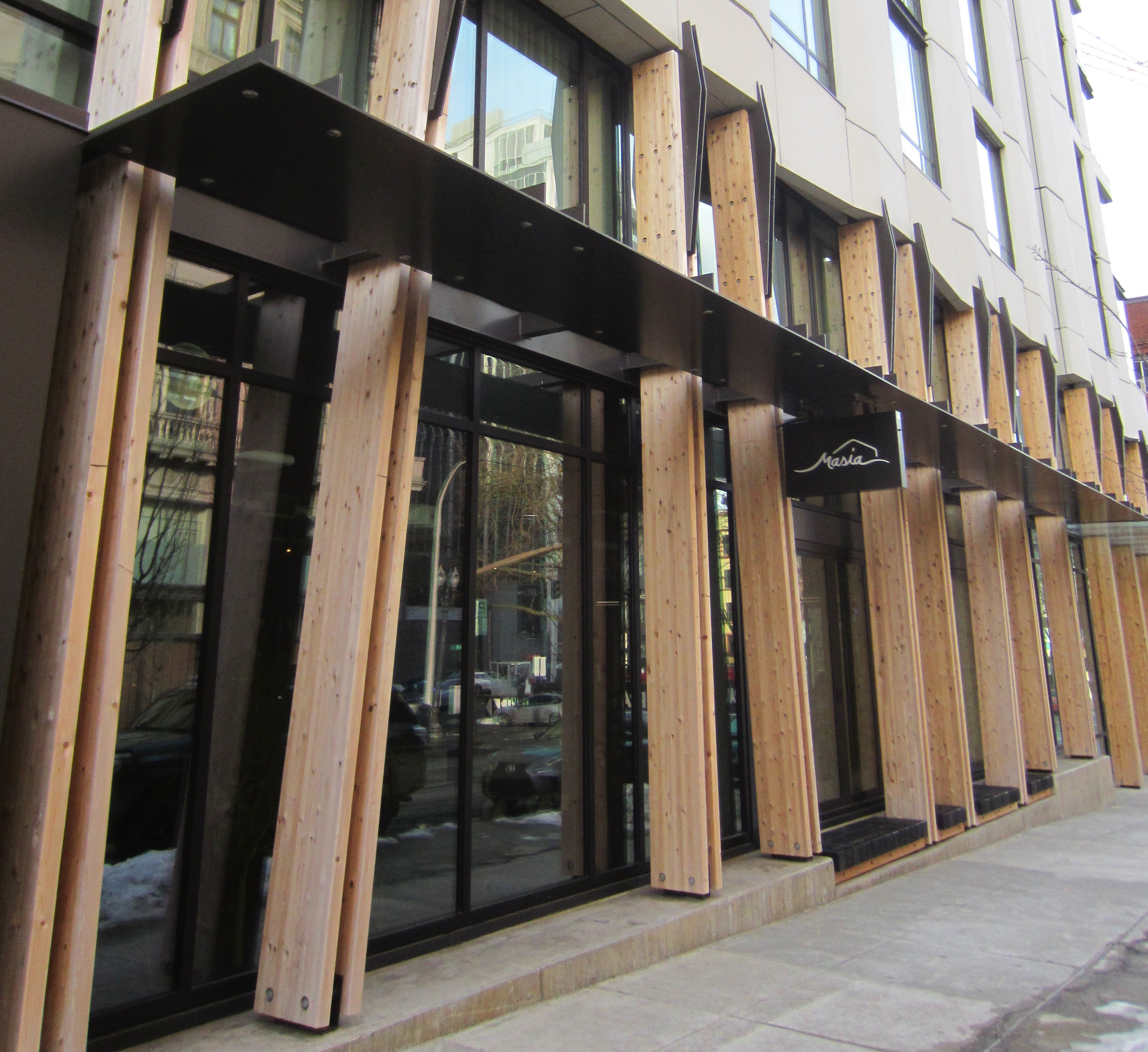
The restaurant's entrance

The menu, inspired by traditional Spanish cuisine and recipes from Chesa's family, included mussels escabeche in vermouth, chicken and mushroom croquettes, paella, Spanish omelettes, jamón ibérico, flautas, patatas bravas, and churros with chocolate. The brunch menu included bacon-and-egg paella, churros and pastries, egg scrambles with blood sausage, tortillas españolas, and glass bread with tomato also available at Ataula.

Filling options for Spanish breads included tortilla española, chorizo and tomato, Mahón cheese and quince, and confit tuna and olive. Chorizo and manchego could be added to the vegan salad. The hamburger had grass-fed ground beef with piquillo peppers, havarti, date-sherry ketchup, and mussels in vermouth. Jackson-Glidden described the happy hour as "vermouth-centric". Masia also had a churro and a coffee counter called 180 Xurros and hosted private events. The restaurateurs behind Masia had served Barcelona-style churros previously at 180 Xurros, before the business closed in 2018.

== History ==
Chef spouses Chesa and Cristina Baez, who also owned the Spanish and Catalan restaurant Ataula, opened Masia with business partner Emily Metivier via White Egg Hospitality on February 14, 2020. The restaurateurs were approached by Hyatt to operate the restaurant, and had hoped to open in January, in conjunction with the hotel's launch. During the week preceding the public opening, Masia served a limited breakfast and lunch menu for hotel guests. Sera Architects and Mortenson designed the restaurant's interior. Within a month of opening, the COVID-19 pandemic forced Governor Kate Brown to restrict dine-in restaurant service. Masia closed temporarily, re-opened in July and operated in various forms for the remainder of 2020. For Labor Day weekend, Masia offered pre-packaged picnic baskets with charcuterie, churros, Russian potato salad, and in-house pickles, plus the option of beer, wine, or non-alcoholic mixed drinks.

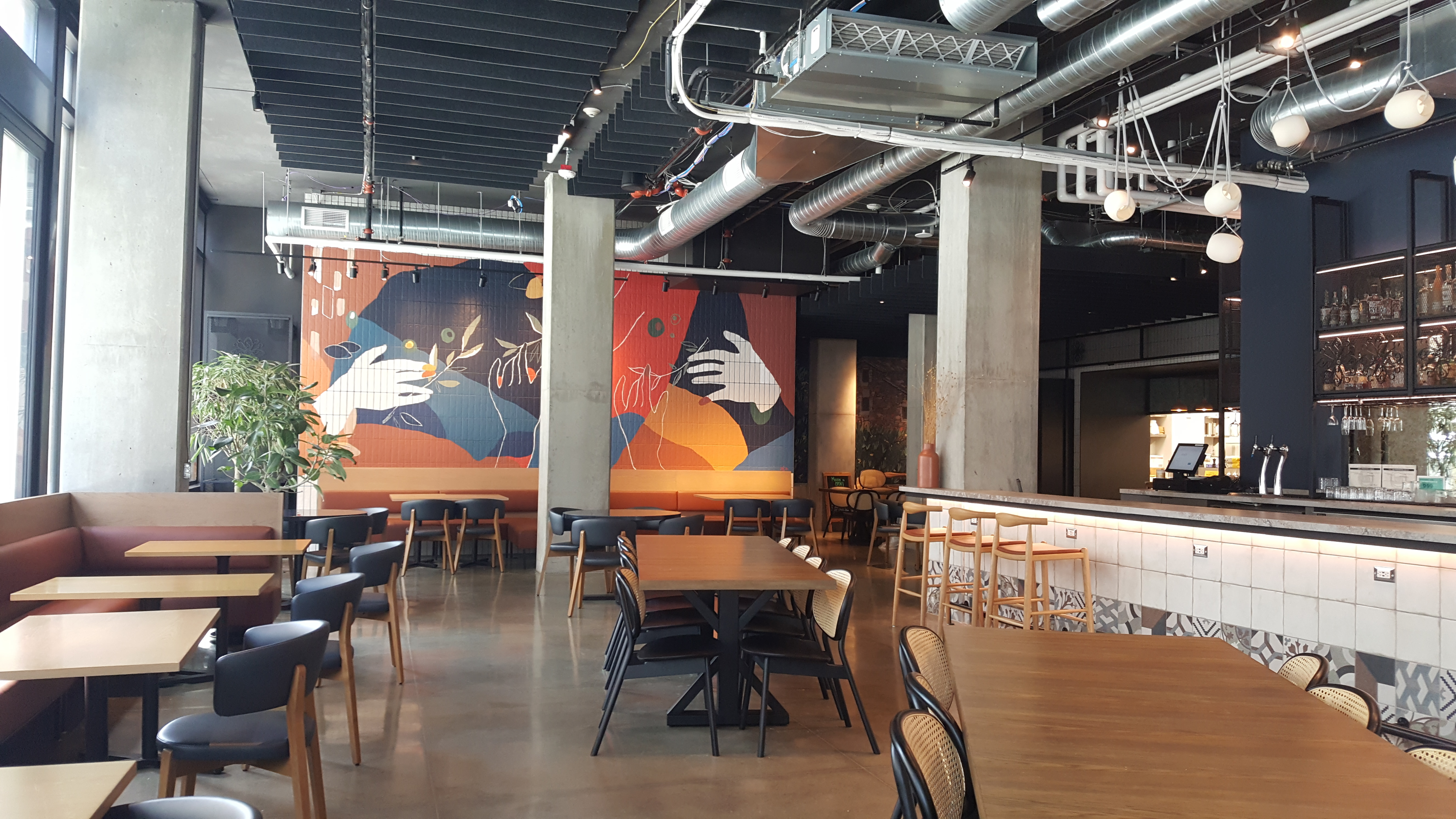
The restaurant's interior in April 2021, shortly after closing

On November 13, Brown restricted restaurants to take-out service only, effective from November 18 to December 2. Baez called the restrictions "heartbreaking" and said, "It's not the worst that (Brown) made the decision to do this, it's just the situation as a whole. Anybody that's not telling you that they're hanging by a thread is lying." She compared the impact of the limitations to Mortal Kombat, saying, "That gruesome fatality at the end, that's what I think of. It's a fatality. Finish him." Unable to offer dine-in service, for Thanksgiving the restaurant offered take-out dinners for two for US$125; the menu featured herb-roasted turkey breast, confit turkey leg, roasted turkey croquettes with Spanish cranberry aioli, French mashed potatoes, Barcelona-style crispy glass bread, turkey demi-glace, chard with jamón ibérico, vermouth, soda, and garnish. Masia accepted digital gift card orders over the phone during the pandemic.

Masia made plans to close temporarily in January 2021. However, in March, the owners confirmed the restaurant would not re-open. In an email to employees, Metivier wrote, "It's been decided that we will no longer be operating Masia beginning at the end of this month. It's been a really rough several months for us and it seems like things are not going to return to the expectations or the vision we had planned for the space."

== Reception ==
Reporting on the restaurant's closure, Jackson-Glidden of Eater Portland wrote, "Masia had a promising first month, showing off some of the most beloved dishes from Ataula as well as new additions. The return of 180 Xurros was a welcome one for many, and it seemed like it was joining the growing ranks of stellar hotel restaurants in downtown Portland ... Here's hoping that the group's other restaurant, Ataula, returns to its full glory, as planned."

== See also ==
- COVID-19 pandemic in Portland, Oregon
- Hispanics and Latinos in Portland, Oregon
- Impact of the COVID-19 pandemic on the restaurant industry in the United States
- List of Spanish restaurants
