= Biwa (disambiguation) =

The biwa is a Japanese short-necked fretted lute.

Biwa may also refer to:

- Biwa, Shiga, a town in Shiga Prefecture, Japan
- Biwa (restaurant), a former restaurant in Portland, Oregon, U.S.
- Biwa trout, an anadromous fish in the salmon family enzootic to Lake Biwa
- Eric Biwa, a former Namibian politician
- Lake Biwa, a lake in Shiga Prefecture, Japan
- Loquat or biwa, a fruit tree in the subfamily Maloideae of the family Rosaceae, indigenous to southeastern China
