= Ración =

Defunct Spanish restaurant in Portland, Oregon, U.S.

- Interactive map of Ración

Restaurant information
- Closed: 2015
- Food type: Spanish
- Location: 1205 Southwest Washington Street, Portland, Multnomah, Oregon, 97205, United States
- Coordinates: 45.5221°N 122.6836°W

Ración was a Spanish restaurant in Portland, Oregon, United States. It operated in downtown Portland, starting as a pop-up in 2012 and as a brick-and-mortar operation from 2013 to 2015.

== Description ==
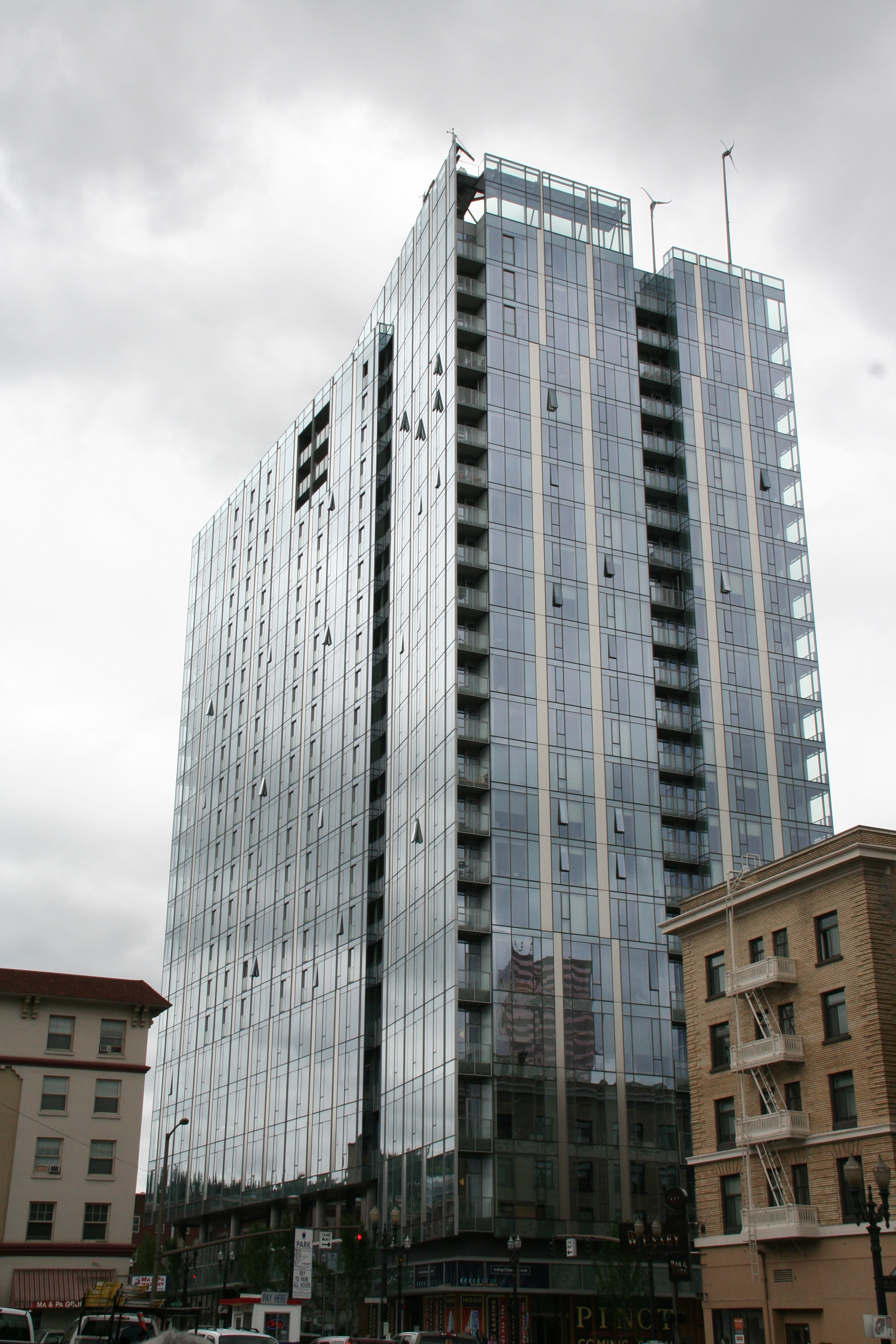
The restaurant operated in the Twelve West (exterior pictured in 2010) building, in downtown Portland's West End district.

The Spanish restaurant and bar Ración operated in the Twelve West building on Southwest Washington Street in downtown Portland's West End district. The open kitchen interior had a horseshoe-shaped bar that wrapped around an island. Willamette Week described Ración as " airy", "friendly", and "sleek-but-not-slick". The restaurant had a seating capacity of 18 people. It hosted a happy hour.

=== Menu ===
The tapas restaurant had an often-changing tasting menu that included halibut with apple and sesame seeds, as well as chocolate ganache with lemon curd, goat cheese, and kumquat. Ración also served cauliflower panna cotta and sous-vide egg with hazelnut romesco. Other ingredients used by Ración included almonds, asparagus, and honey vinegar. The house Manhattan had apple shrub and the Margarita was infused with chorizo and had salted foam. The gin and tonic had strawberry "pearls". Select tapas were available à la carte in the lounge.

== History ==
Anthony Cafiero and Roscoe Roberson were the chef and sous-chef, respectively. In 2014, Roberson left to join Coopers Hall Winery and Taproom. Chauncey Roach was Ración's opening bartender. Chef John Pickett and Anthony Wilkie also worked at the restaurant.

Plans for Ración were made public in 2012. Cafiero debuted the business as a pop-up in 2012, before the brick-and-mortar restaurant opened in March 2013. Ración shared a kitchen with the restaurants Grassa and Lardo. In 2013, Ración participated in Eater Portland's 'Burger Week', offering a special "deconstructed" burger for the campaign, as well as Portland Negroni Week. The restaurant was represented at the food festival Feast Portland in 2013. In 2014, Ración hosted two dinners to commemorate its first anniversary. The restaurant also participated in Portland Dining Month and hosted the pop-up Flight Dessert Bar.

In January 2015, Cafiero began searching for a new location for the restaurant. In May, the business announced plans to close on May 30. Ración closed permanently in late 2015.

== Reception ==
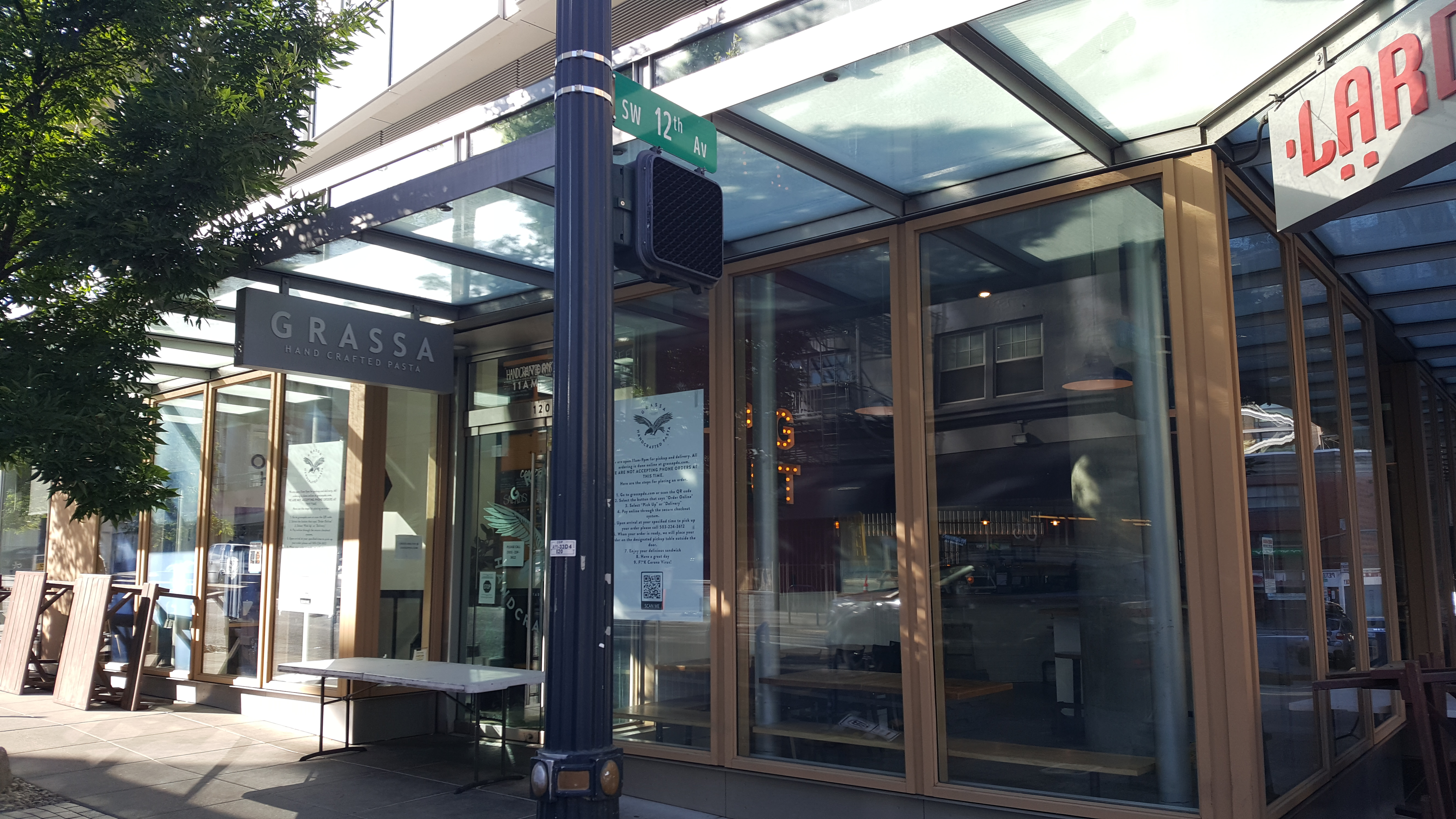
Ración shared a kitchen with Grassa and Lardo (exteriors pictured in 2020).

Karen Brooks included Ración (grouped with Grassa and Lardo) in Portland Monthly's 2013 list of the city's ten best new restaurants, writing, "the trio stands as a snapshot of Portland's food scene: adventurous sandwich shops, the return to comfort food, a crush on modernist cooking, clustered microprojects sharing resources, and not least, downtown's rebirth". Brooks said Ración was the "most interesting" of the three establishments. She said of Ración, "The food doesn't achieve Michelin shine, but Ración may be the most fun room in town." In 2013, the magazine's Benjamin Tepler said Ración and Toro Bravo were restaurants "where foreign inklings and journeys blossom into creative takes on the traditional cuisine". Brooks, Tepler, and Kelly Clarke included Ración in Portland Monthly's overview of the city's most significant restaurant closures of 2015.

Erin DeJesus of Eater Portland described the restaurant's food as "playful and accessible". Willamette Week included Ración in a 2014 list of "our 100 favorite restaurants in Portland". The newspaper's Matthew Korfhage said Roach's drinks "had been playful romps at the edge of possibility". Kerry Politzer of Oregon Jewish Life wrote, "The restaurant’s small plates are almost too beautiful to eat."

== See also ==
- Hispanics and Latinos in Portland, Oregon
- List of defunct restaurants of the United States
- List of Spanish restaurants
