= Bar Casa Vale =

Defunct Spanish restaurant in Portland, Oregon, U.S.

- Interactive map of Bar Casa Vale

Restaurant information
- Food type: Spanish
- Location: 215 Southeast 9th Avenue, Suite 109, Portland, Multnomah, Oregon, 97214, United States
- Coordinates: 45.5213°N 122.6568°W

Bar Casa Vale was a Spanish restaurant in Portland, Oregon, United States. It opened in 2016. In April 2026, the restaurant announced plans to close permanently on April 25.

== Description ==
The Spanish-inspired Bar Casa Vale (BCV) operated on Pine Street in southeast Portland, Oregon's Buckman neighborhood. Matthew Singer of Willamette Week described the bar as "a cozy, sultry hallway of a bar composed of odd little nooks—lit dimly by hurricane lights, southern sun and the flicker of fire". Samantha Bakall of The Oregonian called BCV a "Barcelona- and San Sebastian-inspired pintxos bar serving stand-up snacks and meat and seafood seared to a smoky char in a custom hearth alongside a lush turquoise tile-backed bar specializing in sherry".

BCV served tapas such as jamón Serrano and patatas bravas, as well as larger entrees like pork shoulder. The brunch menu included fried chicken and churros with honey and manchego, salt cod fritters, and chocolate toast with olive oil and pistachio. Drink options included cider, cava-brandy sangria and other cocktails with brandy and sherry.

BCV offered happy hour specials.

== History ==
Plans about the business were made public in February 2016. Staff included Nate Tilden, Elias Cairo, Louis Martinez, and Martin Schwartz. The bar opened in September, in a space that previously housed the music venue La Luna and in the same building as Biwa. In 2017, BCV was among local Spanish restaurants participating in the food festival organized by the Tourist Office of Spain as part of United States for World Tapas Day. The menu was expanded in 2017. Brunch service started in February 2018, but ended in September.

Jacob Harth was the executive chef as of 2018. Erik Van Kley became the executive chef in 2019.

Like many restaurants, BCV closed temporarily during the COVID-19 pandemic, at times operating via take-out and outdoor service on the patio. BCV shared the patio space with Scotch Lodge.

== Reception ==
Michael Russell included BCV in The Oregonian's 2017 list of Portland's ten best Spanish restaurants. Samantha Bakall included the business in the newspaper's 2017 list of the city's best new happy hours. Russell later ranked BCV number 38 in a 2024 list of the forty "best restaurants in Portland you need to try". He also included the business in the newspaper's 2025 list of the 21 best restaurants in southeast Portland.

Lindsay D. Mattison included the business in Tasting Table's 2023 list of Portland's forty best restaurants.

== See also ==
- Hispanics and Latinos in Portland, Oregon
- List of defunct restaurants of the United States
- List of Spanish restaurants
