= List of Spanish restaurants =

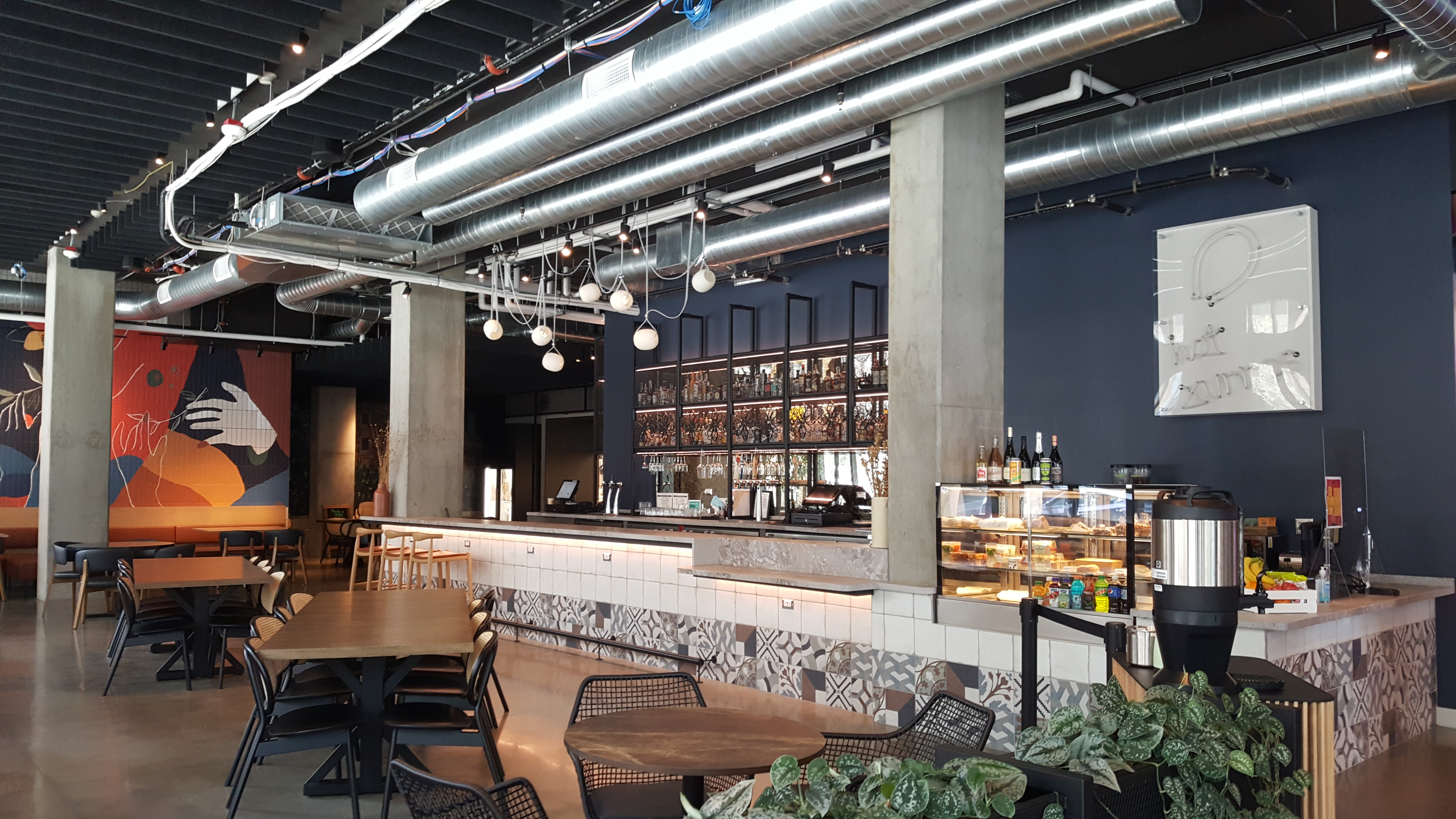
Masia, Portland, Oregon

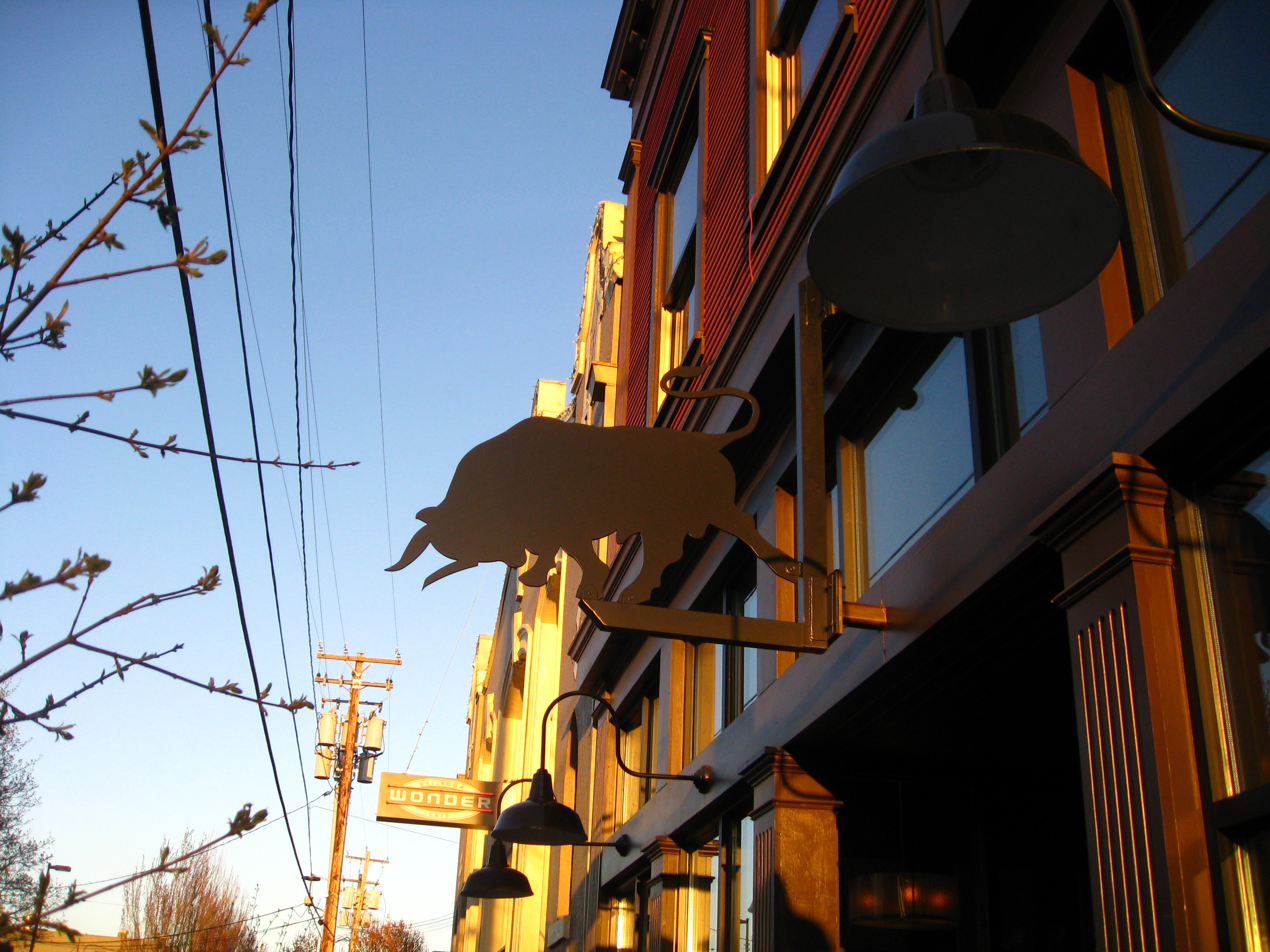
Toro Bravo, Portland, Oregon

Following is a list of notable restaurants known for serving Spanish cuisine:

- Andanada, New York City
- Ataula, Portland, Oregon
- Bar Casa Vale, Portland, Oregon
- Barrafina Dean Street, United Kingdom
- BCN Taste & Tradition, Houston, Texas, U.S.
- Capa, Orlando, Florida
- Casa Mono, New York City
- Columbia Restaurant, Tampa, Florida
- Cranes, Washington, D.C.
- El Faro Restaurant, New York City
- El Quijote, New York City
- El Willy, Shanghai, China
- Esquina Común, Mexico City
- Malagón Mercado y Taperia
- Masia, Portland, Oregon
- Public Kitchen & Bar, Kitchener, Canada
- Ración
- Sabor, London
- Sant Pau, Sant Pol de Mar, Spain
- Sevilla, New York City
- Terra Plata, Seattle
- Toro Bravo, Portland, Oregon
- Urdaneta, Portland, Oregon
- La Vara, Brooklyn, New York
- Xiquet, Washington, D.C.

== See also ==
- List of Spanish dishes
