= Casa Mono =

Restaurant in New York City

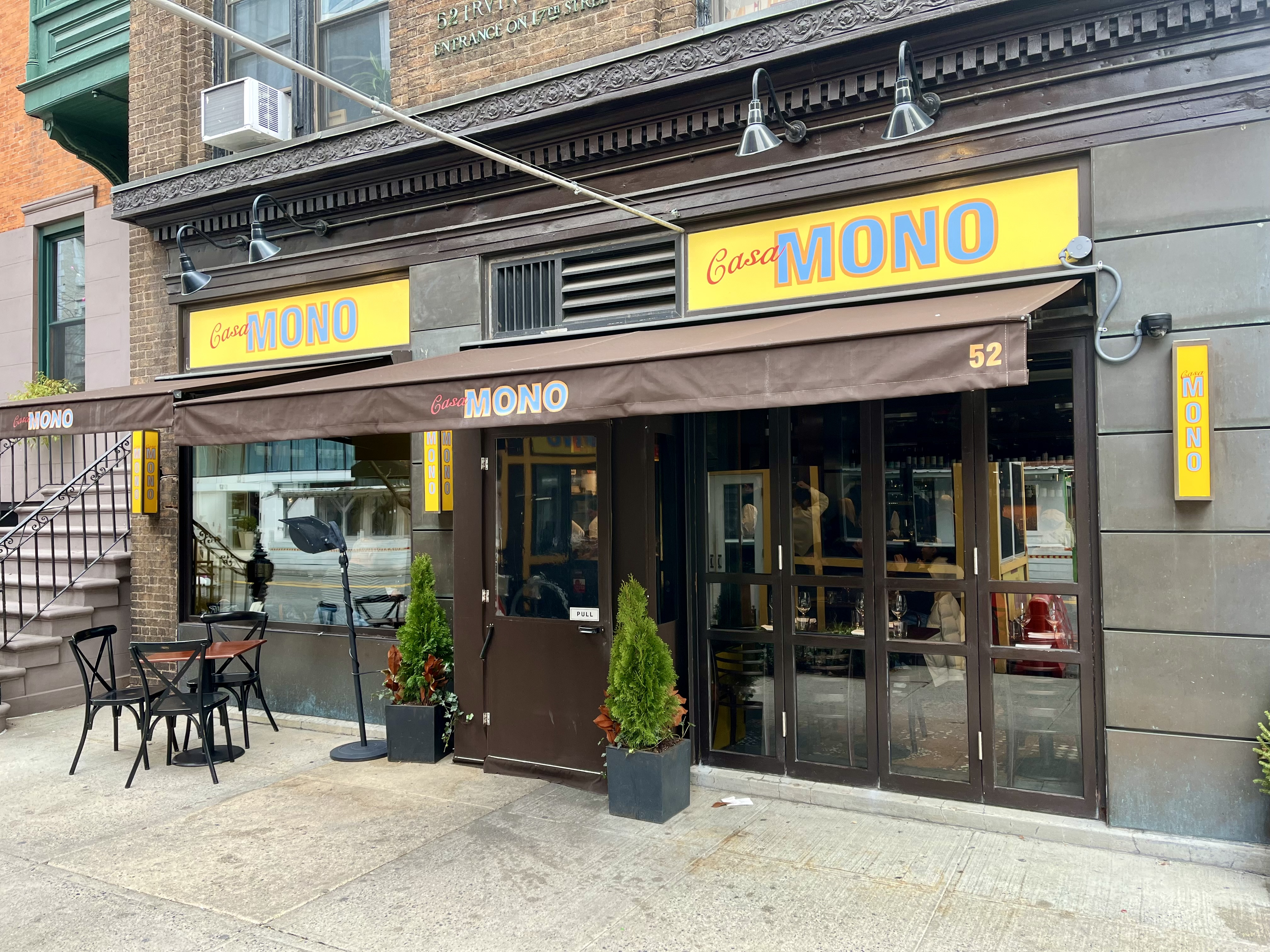
- Casa Mono in December 2023
- Interactive map of Casa Mono

Restaurant information
- Established: 2003
- Head chef: Jonathan Melendez
- Chef: Andy Nusser
- Food type: Spanish
- Rating: (Michelin Guide) (2009 to present)
- Location: 52 Irving Place, New York City, New York, 10003, United States
- Coordinates: 40°44′9.2″N 73°59′13.7″W
- Website: casamononyc.com

Casa Mono is a restaurant in New York City in Gramercy Park, Manhattan. The restaurant serves Spanish cuisine and has received a single Michelin star consistently since 2009.Example dishes include Creamy Eggs with sea urchin, ancient anchovy oil, and walnuts, and razor clam a la Plancha. The restaurant also has a more casual sister spot next door, Bar Jamón.

== See also ==
- List of Michelin-starred restaurants in New York City
- List of Spanish restaurants
