= Sevilla (restaurant) =

Restaurant in New York City, U.S.

Coordinates: 40°44′5.5″N 74°0′11″W

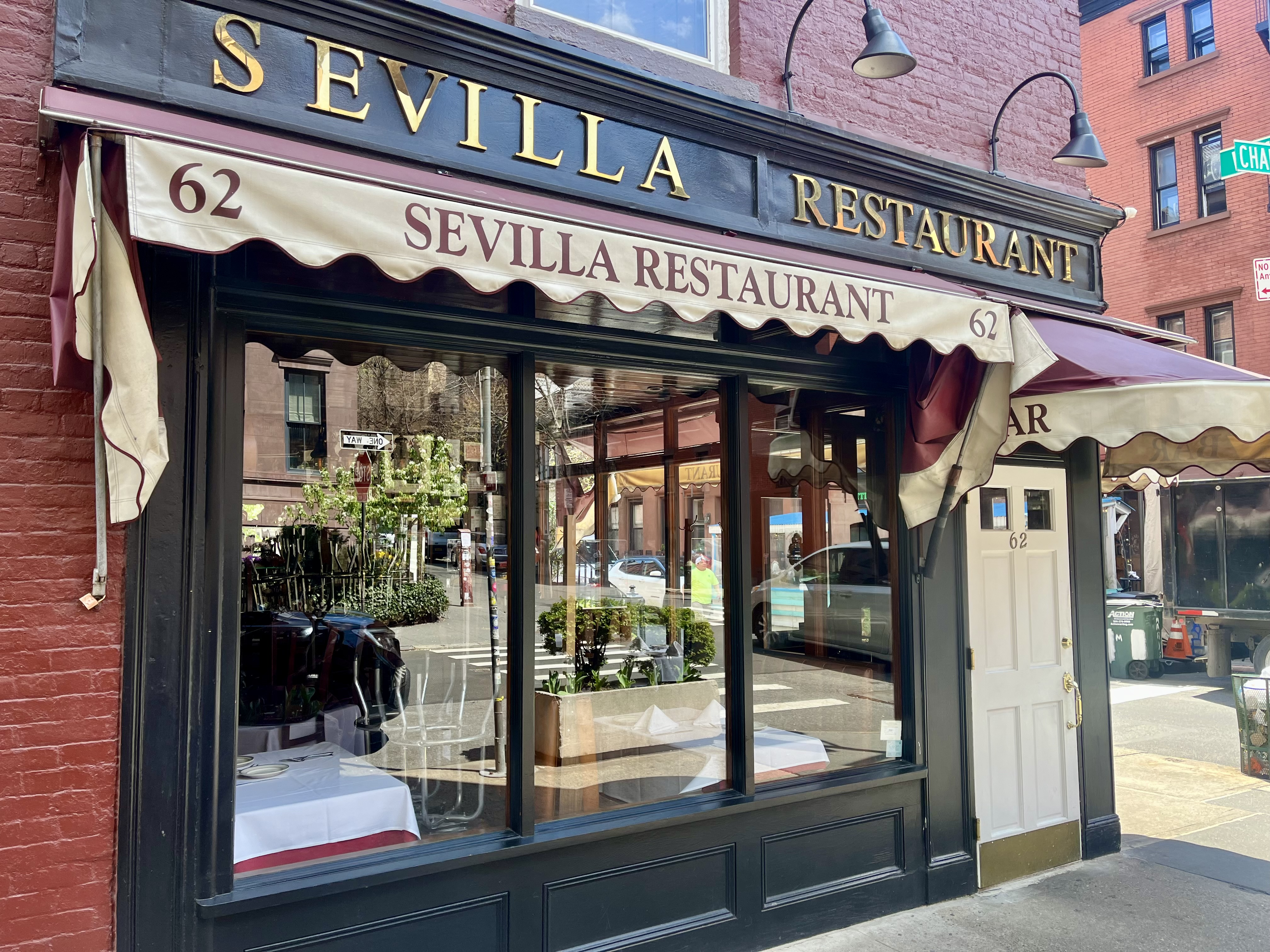
- Sevilla in April 2024
- Interactive map of Sevilla

Restaurant information
- Established: 1923
- Location: 62 Charles Street, New York City, New York, 10014, United States

Sevilla is a restaurant in New York City. In 2015 it was designated as an America's Classic by the James Beard Foundation.

== History ==
The restaurant was opened as an Irish pub in 1923 and in 1941 was changed by Luis Fernandez and Alfonso Uchipi to a Spanish restaurant in what was then New York's Little Spain in the West Village. Mr. Fernandez later sold the business to a gentleman named Tomas Gonzalez and his Basque partners two sons. Mr. Gonzalez ran the business for the next few decades. In 1962 José Lloves purchased the restaurant from Tomas Gonzalez ( Mr. Gonzalez remained as a waiter alongside Jose Lloves for 30 years until he retired). In 1972 Lloves' brother, half-brother, Bienvenido Alvarez, became a partner. In 1984 the owners purchased the building.

When the Beard Foundation called to inform them of the America's Classic award, Lloves, "having no idea what the James Beard Foundation was...had his son, Tony, return the call". Tony Lloves "thought at first it was a scam".

The restaurant seats 91. It is the oldest Spanish restaurant in the city.

== Menu ==
The restaurant focusses on Spanish staples such as shellfish, paella, empanadillas, and veal and serves sangria and classic cocktails. The menu is largely unchanged from when the restaurant opened.

== Recognition ==
In 2015 the restaurant was designated an America's Classic by the James Beard Foundation.

== See also ==
- List of Spanish restaurants
