= La Vara (restaurant) =

Spanish restaurant in Brooklyn, New York, U.S.

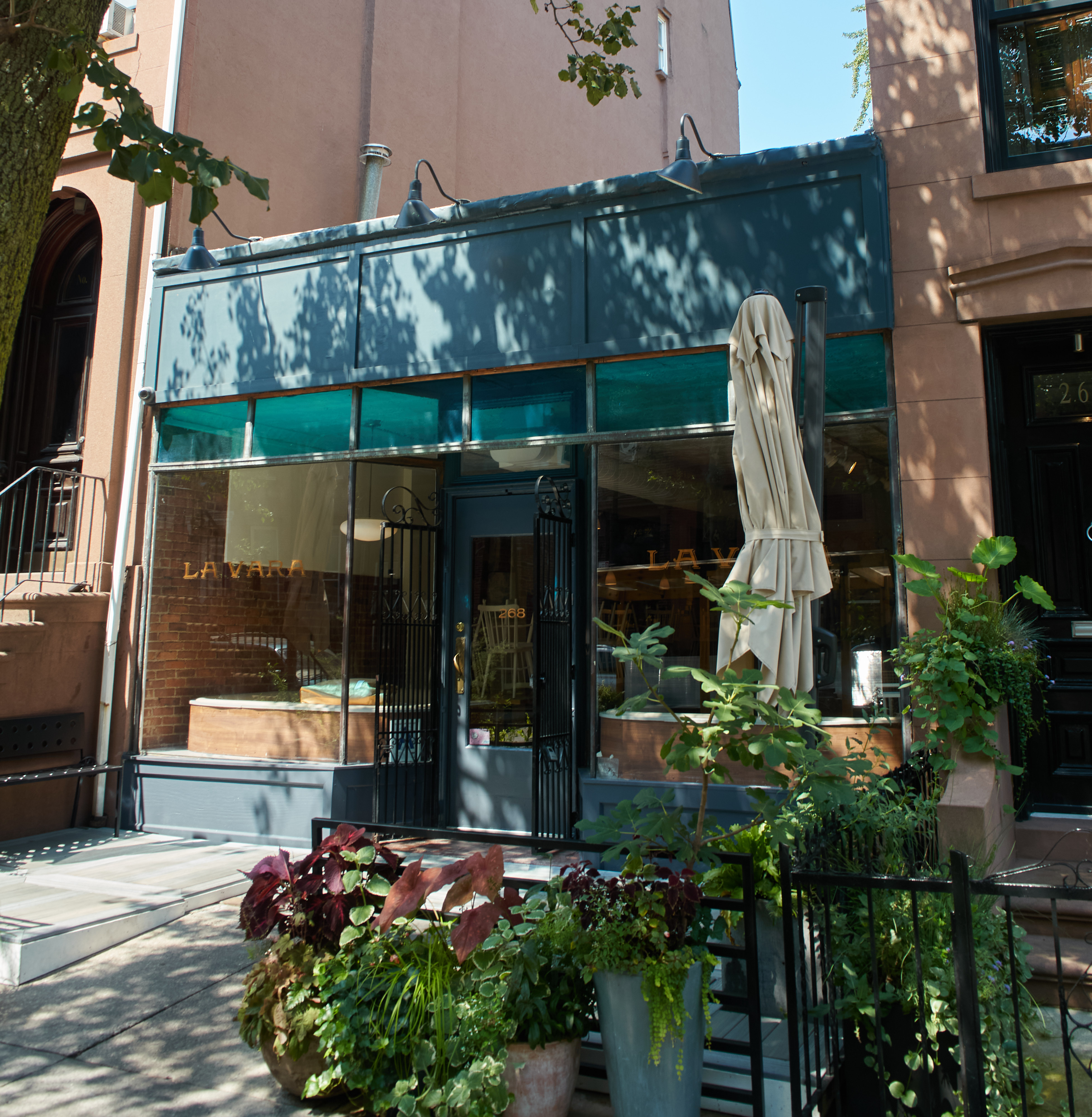
- Interactive map of La Vara

Restaurant information
- Established: March 2012
- Head chef: Alex Raij
- Food type: Spanish
- Location: 268 Clinton Street, Brooklyn, New York, 11201, United States
- Coordinates: 40°41′16.1″N 73°59′44.5″W
- Website: https://www.lavarany.com/

La Vara is a restaurant in Cobble Hill, Brooklyn, in the U.S. state of New York. The restaurant serves Spanish tapas and has received a Michelin star.

== See also ==
- List of Michelin-starred restaurants in New York City
- List of Spanish restaurants
