= Natural Selection (restaurant) =

Defunct restaurant in Portland, Oregon, U.S.

Restaurant information
- Established: March 2011
- Closed: June 2016
- Owner: Aaron Woo
- Head chef: Aaron Woo
- Location: Portland, Multnomah, Oregon, United States
- Seating capacity: 30

Natural Selection was a farm-to-table, fine dining restaurant in Portland, Oregon, United States. It operated in Northeast Portland's Concordia neighborhood from March 2011 to June 2016. Owned by chef Aaron Woo, the restaurant served vegetarian, vegan, and gluten-free food. It garnered a positive reception and was named one of Portland's best vegetarian restaurants by Thrillist, the nation's best vegan establishments by The Daily Meal, and the nation's best vegetarian restaurants by Time Out.

== Description ==
The farm-to-table, fine dining restaurant Natural Selection operated on Alberta Street in Northeast Portland's Concordia neighborhood, serving vegetarian, vegan, and gluten-free food. Portland Monthly described the restaurant as "the most upscale of Alberta Street's abundant vegetarian options". The 700-square-foot space had a seating capacity of approximately 30 people. The interior had art and mirrors. The dining room had wood floors and there was an open kitchen. A sign above a door read, "Eat your vegetables". New York called the restaurant "upscale". Natural Selection has also been described as a supper club.

=== Menu ===
The Mediterranean-focused Natural Selection offered prix fixe menus with dishes and ingredients including hazelnut blini with asparagus, carrot cream, chioggia beet salad, and turnip. The restaurant also served gnocchi; a fig and pluot salad with avocado, lemon, and pickled onion; polenta and piperade with squash blossom; and a chanterelle pasta with basil pistou, beet, cipollinis, flageolets, and walnuts. The menu was often determined by farmers' market purchases.

== History ==
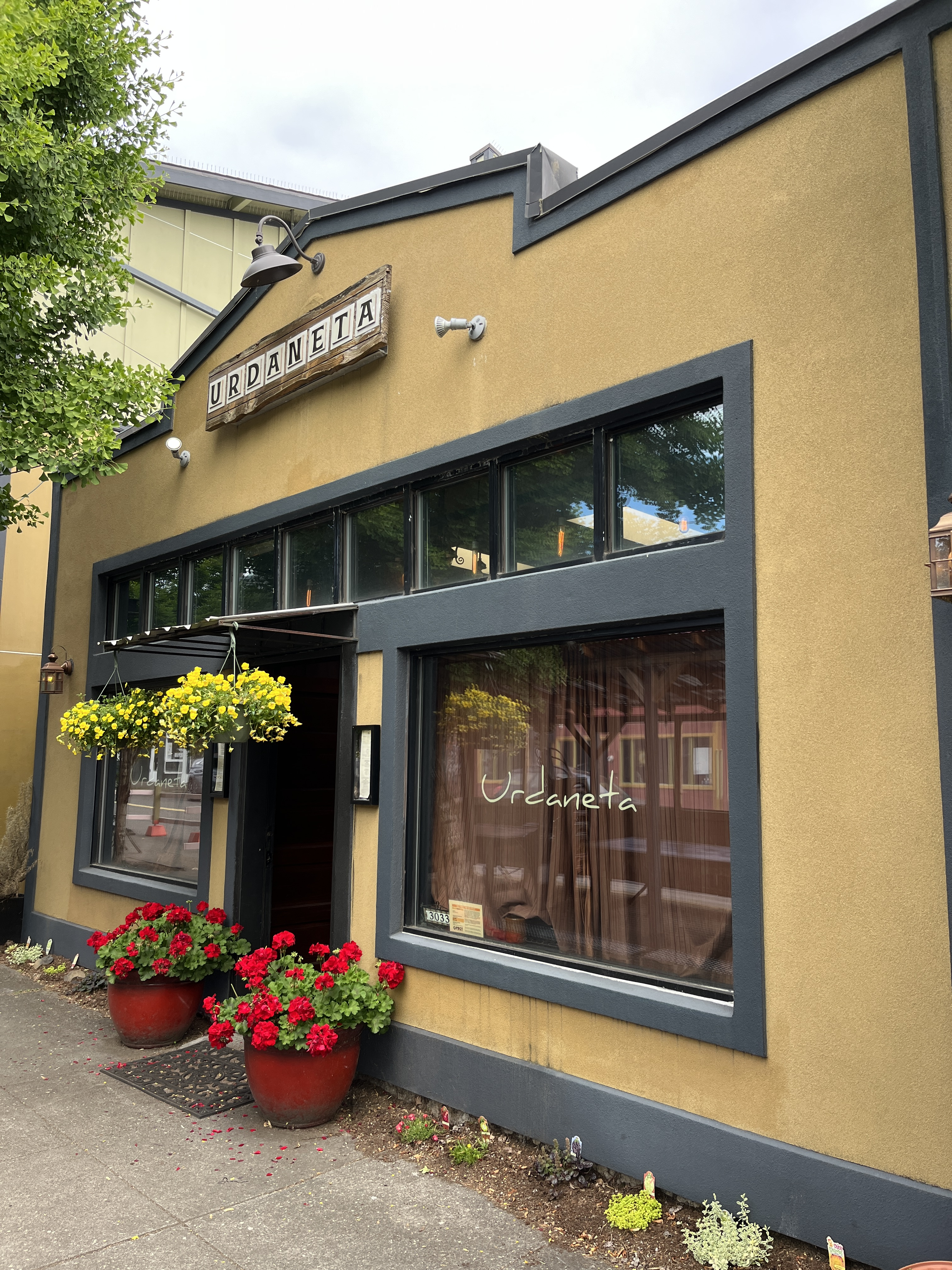
2025 photograph of the exterior of Urdaneta, which operates in the space that previously housed Natural Selection

Plans about the restaurant's launch were revealed in early 2011. Natural Selection began operating in March 2011. Aaron Woo was the chef and owner. Chris Soffner was the sous-chef.

Ed Begley Jr. dined at the restaurant in April 2011. Natural Selection hosted its first wine dinner in May 2011. For Veg Fest in September 2011, the restaurant had an all-vegan menu.

In May 2016, the restaurant announced plans to close permanently on June 11. The restaurant Urdaneta later operated in the space.

== Reception ==
Grant Butler of The Oregonian gave the restaurant a rating of 'A-' in 2011. The business was a runner-up for Eater Portland's Restaurant of the Year designation in 2011. In 2012, the website's Erin DeJesus said Natural Selection "quickly collected accolades for its upscale, seasonal treatment of vegetables". She said the restaurant's four-course prix fixe menu was "one of the best deals in town" in 2013, also including Natural Selection in a list of the city's 21 "favorite" vegan dishes.

Woo received a Trailblazing Chef Award from Cooking Light in 2013. The magazine said, "Forethought makes Natural Selection both a cerebral and a sensual experience, but there's no need to think much past this simple fact: For pure deliciousness, Woo's food takes produce-based cooking to the next level." Natural Selection was included in OpenTable's 2013 list of the nation's top 100 restaurants. Michelle Udem included the business in Thrillist's 2015 overview of Portland's best vegetarian restaurants. Natural Selection was also included in Time Out's 2015 overview of the nation's best vegetarian restaurants. Samantha Bakall included Natural Selection in The Oregonian's list of "the 15 biggest Portland restaurant and bar closings of 2016". Dan Myers included the business in The Daily Meal's 2017 overview of the nation's best vegan restaurants.

== See also ==
- List of defunct restaurants of the United States
- List of vegetarian and vegan restaurants
