= Urdaneta (restaurant) =

Spanish restaurant in Portland, Oregon, U.S.

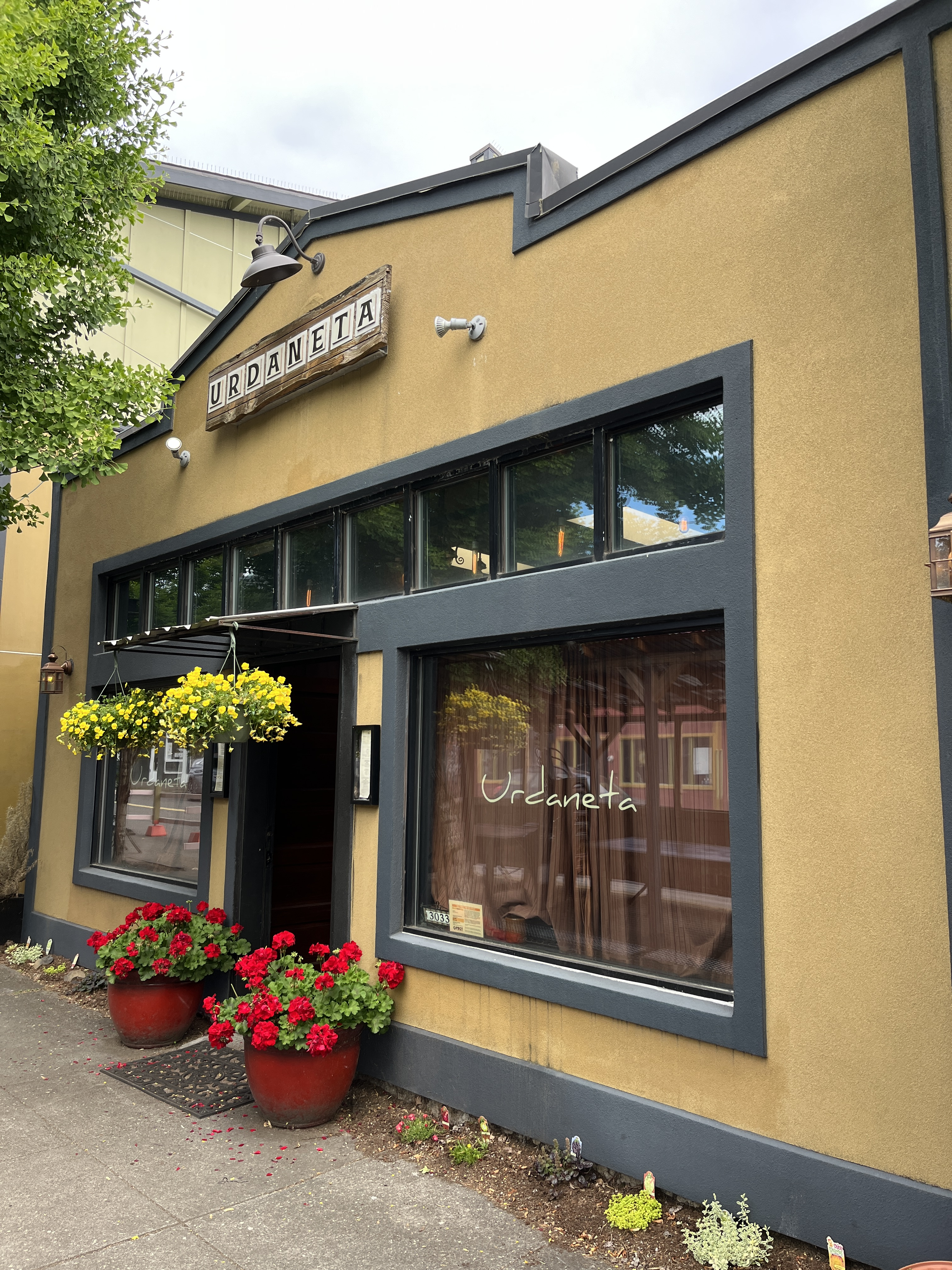
- The restaurant's exterior, 2025
- Interactive map of Urdaneta

Restaurant information
- Food type: Spanish
- Location: 3033 Northeast Alberta Street, Portland, Multnomah, Oregon, 97211, United States
- Coordinates: 45°33′33″N 122°38′03″W

Urdaneta is a Spanish tapas restaurant and wine bar in Portland, Oregon, United States. Chef Javier Canteras opened the restaurant in 2016.

== Description ==
Urdaneta operates on Alberta Street, near the intersection of 31st Avenue, in northeast Portland. Named after the owner's mother, the restaurant serves cuisine from Northern Spain and the Basque region.

== History ==
The restaurant opened in 2016, in the space previously occupied by Natural Selection. Urdaneta was founded by chef Javier Canteras. It began serving weekend brunch in 2020.

== Reception ==
Rebecca Roland included the tarta de queso in Eater Portland's 2025 overview of the city's eleven best restaurants for desserts.

== See also ==
- List of Spanish restaurants
