= El Willy =

Coordinates: 31.2306°N 121.4940°E

- Interactive map of El Willy

Restaurant information
- Established: 2008
- Location: Shanghai, China

El Willy is a Spanish restaurant in Shanghai, China. It opened in January 2008 and is operated by chef Willy Trullas Moreno, who is from Spain. The restaurant relocated from a colonial house in Shanghai's French concession to a space in The Bund in 2012.

== See also ==
- List of Spanish restaurants
