= Cranes (restaurant) =

Restaurant in Washington, D.C., U.S.

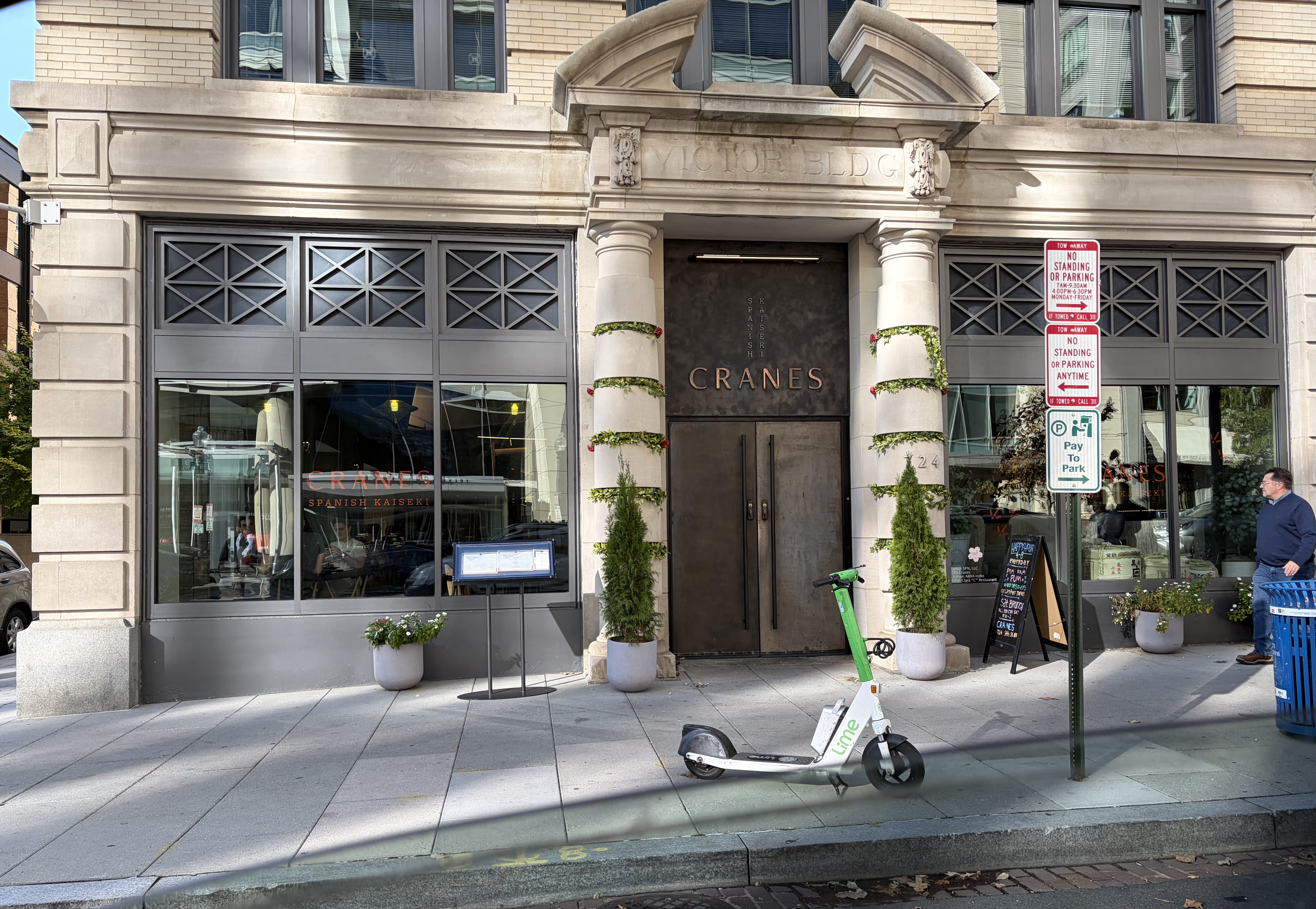
- Exterior of Cranes from 9th Street NW
- Interactive map of Cranes

Restaurant information
- Established: February 8, 2020
- Closed: February 18, 2026
- Owner: Pepe Moncayo
- Chef: Pepe Moncayo
- Food type: Japanese; Spanish
- Location: 724 9th Street NW, Washington, D.C., 20001, United States
- Coordinates: 38°53′57″N 77°1′27″W
- Website: cranes-dc.com

Cranes was a restaurant in the Penn Quarter neighborhood of Washington, D.C., United States. The restaurant was opened on February 8, 2020, by chef Pepe Moncayo, and blended Japanese and Spanish cuisine. It received a Michelin star in 2021. However, with the 2023 Michelin Guide, the restaurant lost its status.

Cranes closed on February 18, 2026 with Moncayo not disclosing the closure reasons.

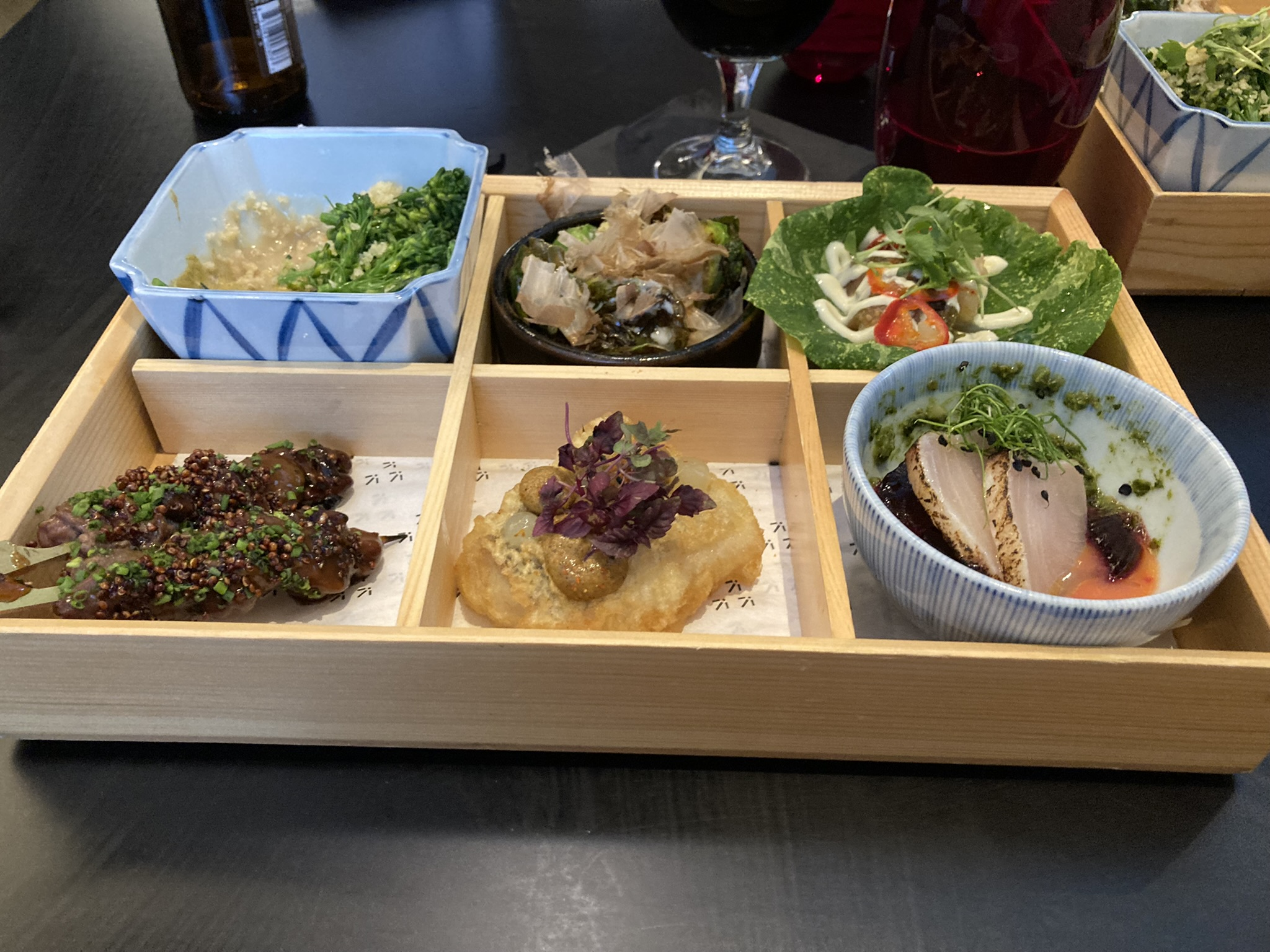
A bento box lunch at Cranes

== See also ==
- List of Japanese restaurants
- List of Michelin-starred restaurants in Washington, D.C.
- List of Spanish restaurants
