= Terra Plata =

Restaurant in Seattle, Washington, U.S.

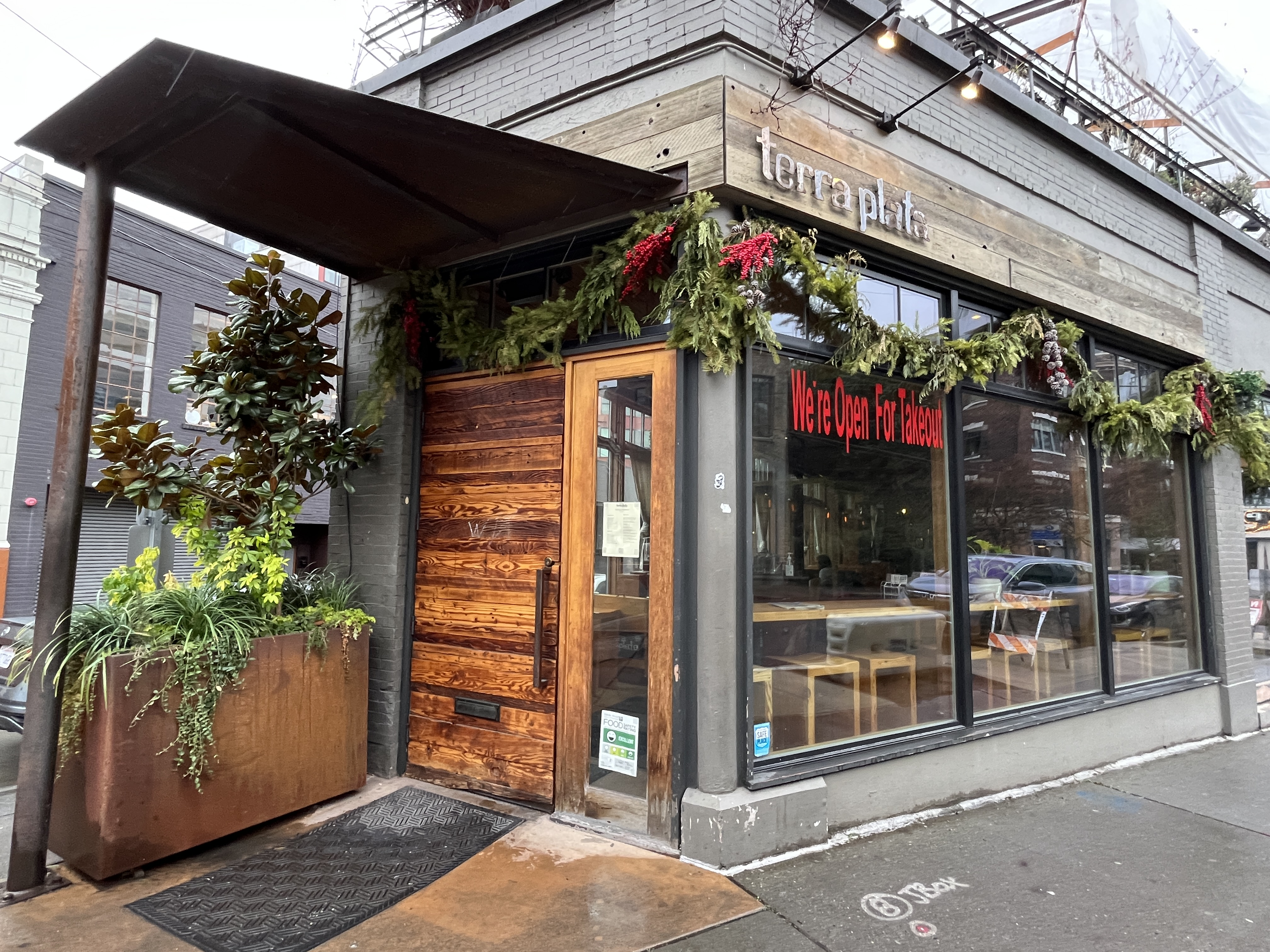
- The restaurant's exterior in January 2023
- Interactive map of Terra Plata

Restaurant information
- Food type: Pacific Northwest; Spanish
- Location: 1501 Melrose Avenue, Seattle, King, Washington, 98122, United States
- Coordinates: 47°36′52″N 122°19′41″W

Terra Plata is a restaurant in Seattle, in the U.S. state of Washington.

== Description ==
The LGBTQ-owned restaurant has served Pacific Northwest and Spanish cuisine. Thrillist says, "Terra Plata is the Captain Planet of organic eateries, highlighting choices from air, land, and sea." Time Out says, "The epitome of an urban oasis, this rooftop patio peering over Capitol Hill doubles as an herb garden for homegrown ingredients."

== History ==
Chef and owner Tamara Murphy opened the restaurant in 2012.

== Reception ==
Thrillist's Emma Bank included the business in a 2022 list of "The Most Romantic Restaurants in Seattle" and wrote, "Terra Plata's rooftop is almost unbeatable in terms of ambiance, but let's talk about the food: hyper local and ever-evolving, Chef Tamara Murphy's menu is always in-season and always delicious." Sami Sparber included the restaurant in Axios Seattle's 2022 list of "4 must-try rooftop bars in Seattle".

== See also ==
- List of Pacific Northwest restaurants
- List of Spanish restaurants
