= Phuket Cafe =

Thai restaurant in Portland, Oregon, U.S.

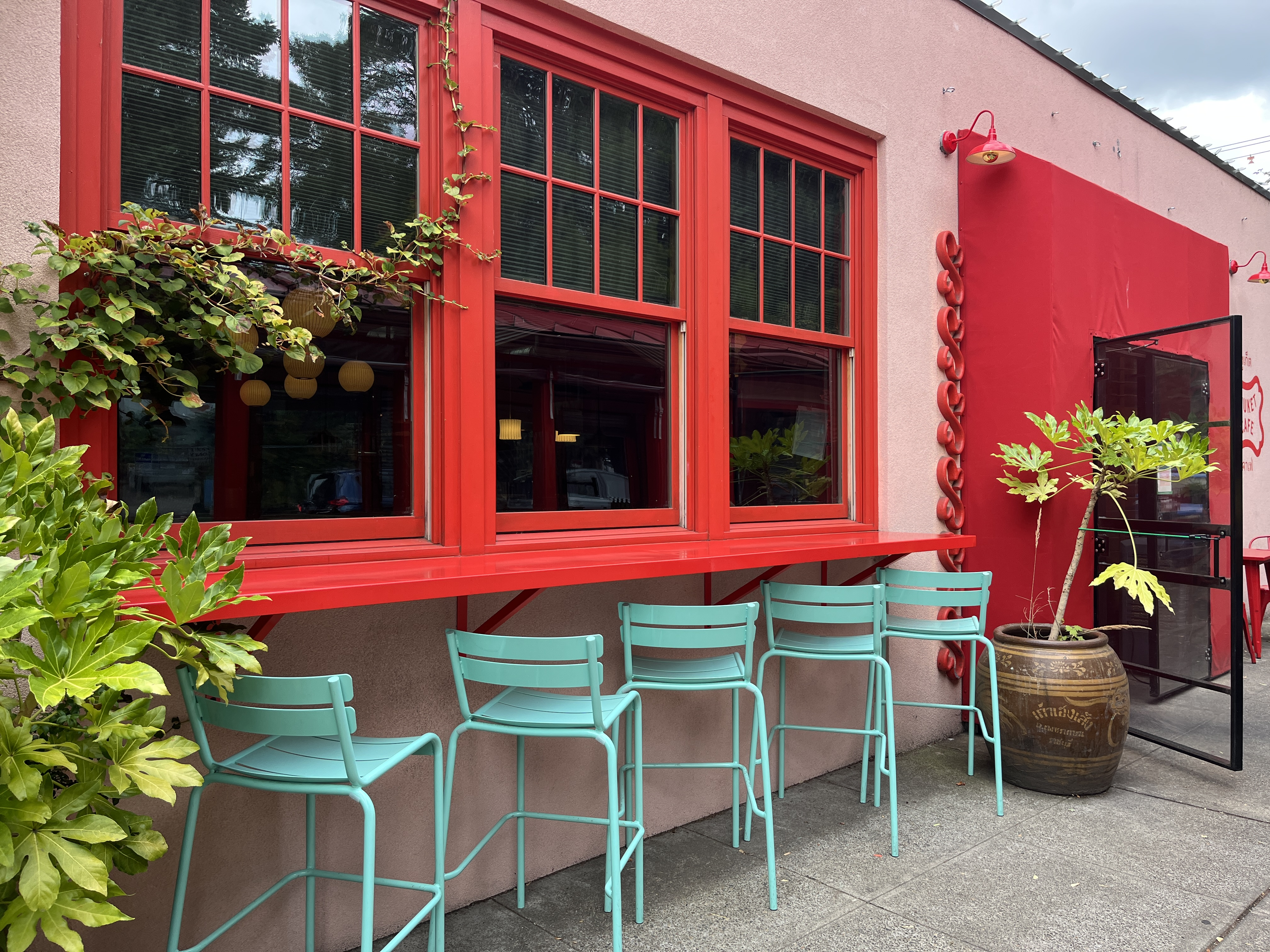
- The restaurant's exterior, 2025
- Interactive map of Phuket Cafe

Restaurant information
- Food type: Thai
- Location: 1818 Northwest 23rd Place, Portland, Multnomah, Oregon, 97210, United States
- Coordinates: 45.5358°N 122.6997°W
- Website: phuketcafepdx.com

Phuket Cafe is a Thai restaurant in Portland, Oregon, United States.

== Description ==
The Thai restaurant operates near 23rd Avenue in northwest Portland's Northwest District. The menu includes kabocha squash curry puffs, cheese roti with beetroot, ceviche with albacore, and paella with octopus and chili jam.

== History ==
Established in 2022, Phuket Cafe operates in the space that previously housed Ataula. The business has used meat from Tails & Trotters.

== Reception ==
Phuket Cafe ranked third in The Oregonian's list of Portland's best new restaurants of 2022. Bon Appétit included the kakigōri in a 2023 list of the "most delightful" desserts at new restaurants. Alex Frane and Maya MacEvoy included Phuket Cafe in Eater Portland's 2023 list of "quintessential" eateries in the Slabtown district.

== See also ==
- List of Thai restaurants
