= Xiquet =

Spanish restaurant in Washington, D.C., U.S.

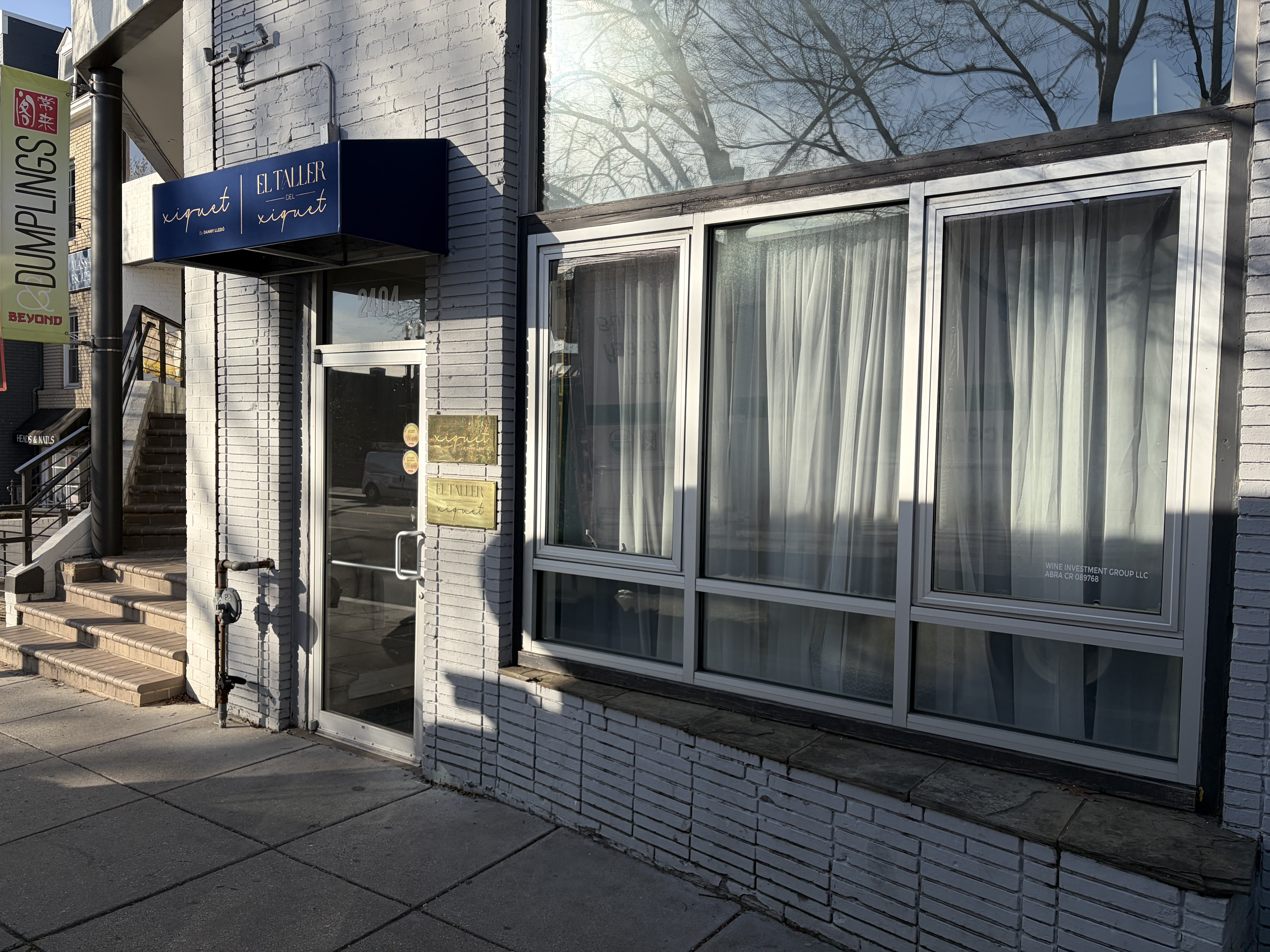
- Xiquet in 2026
- Interactive map of Xiquet

Restaurant information
- Established: March 2020
- Food type: Spanish
- Rating: (Michelin Guide)
- Location: 2404 Wisconsin Avenue NW, Washington, D.C., 20007, United States
- Coordinates: 38°55′16.7″N 77°4′20.7″W
- Website: xiquetdl.com

Xiquet is a Spanish restaurant by chef Danny Lledó in Washington, D.C. The restaurant has received a Michelin star.

== Description ==
Xiquet is a Spanish restaurant in Washington, D.C. The menu has included an octopus salad and braised oxtail with foie gras and truffle, barnacles, and tuna loin.

The name of the restaurant means "kid" in Valencian Catalan. This is a homage to the chef's origins in Dénia (Valencian Country). He has described the restaurant's menu as "75% Valencian and 15% classic cuisine, with some local products".

== History ==
The restaurant opened in March 2020.

== See also ==
- List of Michelin-starred restaurants in Washington, D.C.
- List of Spanish restaurants
