= Tamara Murphy =

American chef (1960/1961–2024)

- Born: 1961; Freedom, Pennsylvania, U.S.
- Died: August 11, 2024 (aged 63)
- Culinary career
- Current restaurant: Terra Plata
- Previous restaurants: Elliott Bay Café; Café Campagne; Brasa
- Award(s) won: 1995 James Beard Foundation Award Best Chef Pacific Northwest and Hawaii

Tamara Murphy (1961 – August 11, 2024) was an American chef who owned and ran the restaurant Terra Plata in Seattle. In 1994, Food & Wine named her Best New Chef. In 1995, she won the James Beard Foundation Award for Best Chef in the Pacific Northwest and Hawaii.

Murphy suffered a stroke on August 7, 2024. She was kept on life support to allow for organ donation and died on August 11, at the age of 63.

== Early life ==
According to a Seattle Times article on August 11, 2024, Murphy was born in Freedom, Pennsylvania, and grew up in North Carolina, spending her early teenage years in Peru. Her first industry job was in Charlotte, North Carolina, working for a Sicilian couple at the bar of their restaurant, Mangione’s. Unbeknownst to them, she was only 15 years old.

== Career ==
After working in several New York City based restaurants, Murphy moved to Seattle. She worked at the restaurant Dominique's, where she was a sous chef. While working there, she competed in the Bocuse d'Or competition. After two years, she joined the 4-star restaurant Campagne as executive chef, where she was nominated for the James Beard Foundation Award for Rising Star Chef.

In 1993, she oversaw the opening of Café Campagne, while continuing to work at Campagne. She won the 1995 James Beard Foundation Award for Best Chef in the Pacific Northwest and Hawaii while running those restaurants. She decided to open her own restaurant and with the backing of the owners of Campagne, opened Brasa in 1999. Brasa was initially such a success that the 170-seat restaurant was regularly full, but closed after a few years due to the economic downturn. She began running the Elliott Bay Café in 2008, where she served an organic and sustainable menu.

As a feature on Murphy in Edible Seattle phrased it, "Murphy was walking the seasonal-farm-to-table walk before it was in vogue, and she’s one of the most influential chefs in locavore dining in the region."

Following a legal battle with the developers, she opened her "Earth to Plate" restaurant Terra Plata in 2011, where she continued to serve food from local farms. Although the menu changed daily, Terra Plata’s farm-to-table menu melds Spanish, Middle Eastern, and Mediterranean influences. Murphy’s signature dish, though, was a constant: roasted pig with manila clams, chorizo, sofrito, hot smoked paprika, bay-scented potato, and chicharron.

In 2008, Murphy founded the long-running fundraising event, "An Incredible Feast", with the non-profit Seattle Neighborhood Farmers Markets. The event raised funds for the Good Farmer Fund, a resource that provides emergency financial resources when producers face losses from extreme weather, fire, flood, or other unexpected events. In 2015, Murphy and her life and business partner Linda di Lello Morton were honored by the Greater Seattle Business Association (GBSA) as Community Leaders of the Year. In a Facebook post, they responded to the award by saying, “Success comes from being an active participant in our community."

The co-owners of Terra Plata have long been neighborhood and city leaders in the restaurant industry, in 2020 turning their creative energies to helping food and drink businesses figure out how to survive and emerge from the COVID-19 pandemic. Murphy and di Lello Morton started Food Is Love, "a project to get restaurants back to work by making meals for people who need it," as described in this 2020 online news article. In that article, they said of the volunteer effort, “Our goal was to do two things: get restaurants back to work and to provide food to vulnerable families and individuals with healthy, nutritious, and tasty meals.” And that they did, as Food Is Love provided more than 38,000 meals to families facing food insecurity during the COVID-19 pandemic.
