= Malagón Mercado y Taperia =

Spanish restaurant in Charleston, South Carolina, U.S.

- Interactive map of Malagón Mercado y Taperia

Restaurant information
- Location: Charleston, South Carolina, United States
- Coordinates: 32.7928°N 79.9417°W
- Website: malagonchs.com

Malagón Mercado y Taperia, or simply Malagón, is a Michelin-starred Spanish restaurant in Charleston, South Carolina, United States.

== See also ==
- List of Michelin-starred restaurants in the American South
- List of Spanish restaurants
