= Andanada =

Coordinates: 40.776221°N 73.981482°W

- Interactive map of Andanada

Restaurant information
- Established: 2012
- Closed: 2017
- Head chef: Manuel Berganza
- Food type: Spanish
- Location: New York City, New York, United States

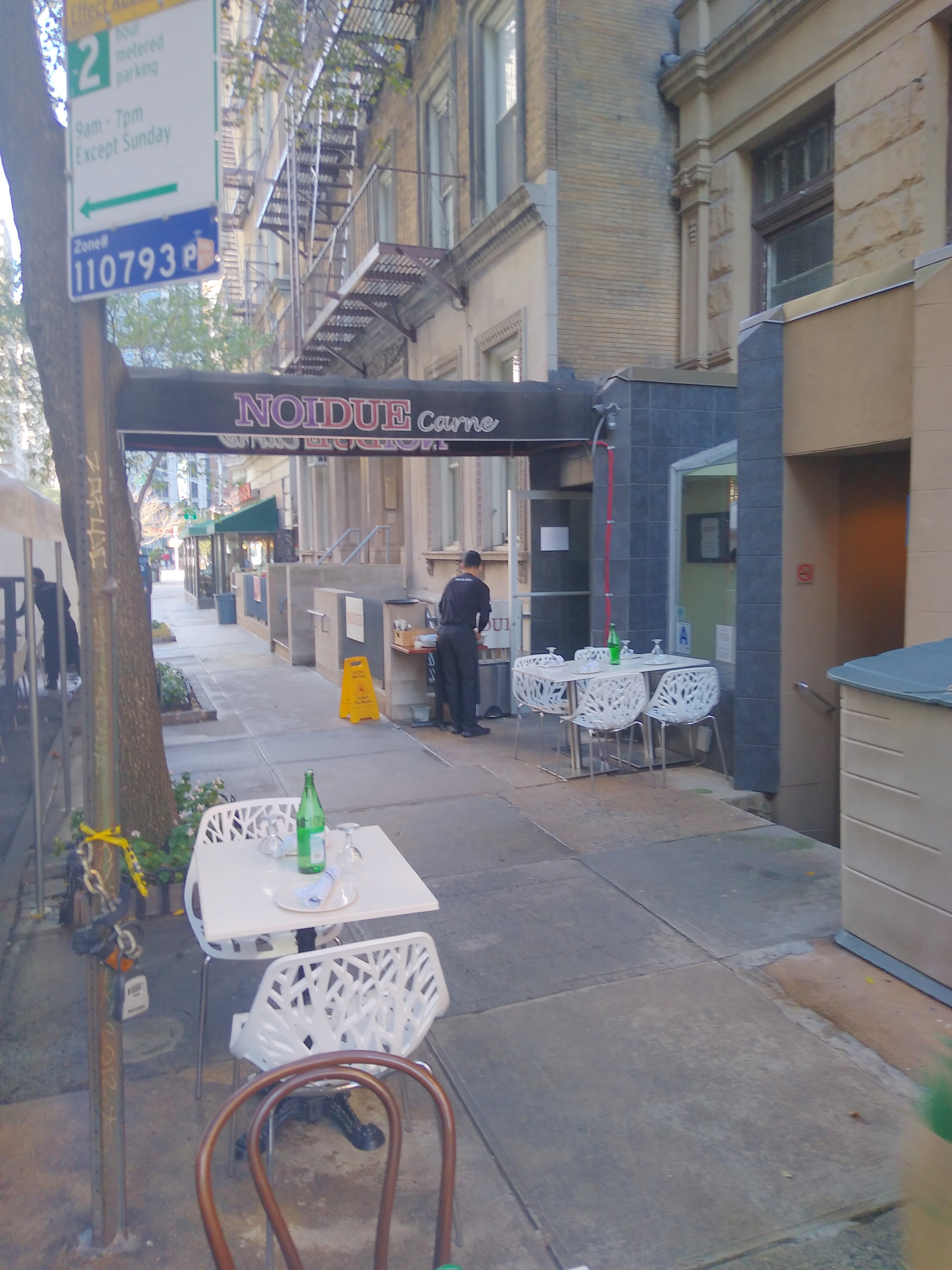
Location had a different restaurant in 2020

Andanada was a Spanish restaurant located at 141 West 69th Street (between Broadway and Columbus) on the Upper West Side in Manhattan, New York City. Opening in 2012 under chef Manuel Berganza, it earned one Michelin star in 2014, which it maintained until its reported closure in 2017.

Andanada served contemporary Spanish cuisine. Its menu featured a selection of tapas, alongside other dishes like shellfish paella and arroz con leche. The restaurant's name, Andanada, refers to the highest seating area in the bullfighting arena.

In 2014, Andanada was awarded a Michelin Star in the 2015 Michelin Guide to New York City. It maintained its star rating for the 2016 and 2017 editions of the guide.

== History ==
Andanada was established in 2012 as Andanada 141 by a restaurant group consisting of Spanish investors. One of the investors, Álvaro Reinoso, said the idea to open a Spanish restaurant came to him when he realized that there was a potential market for authentic, yet contemporary Spanish cuisine in New York City. Reinoso formed a partnership with a group of people that owned Gastroarte, taking over the place after Gastroarte's chef left. He then contacted chef Manuel Berganza, who had previously received Michelin stars for his duties at Sergi Arola and La Broche, both in Madrid.

In February 2017, Berganza announced on his Instagram account that he was leaving Andanada. Later that year, it was reported that the restaurant quietly closed.

== See also ==
- List of Spanish restaurants
