= Hyatt Centric Downtown Portland =

Hotel in Portland, Oregon, U.S.

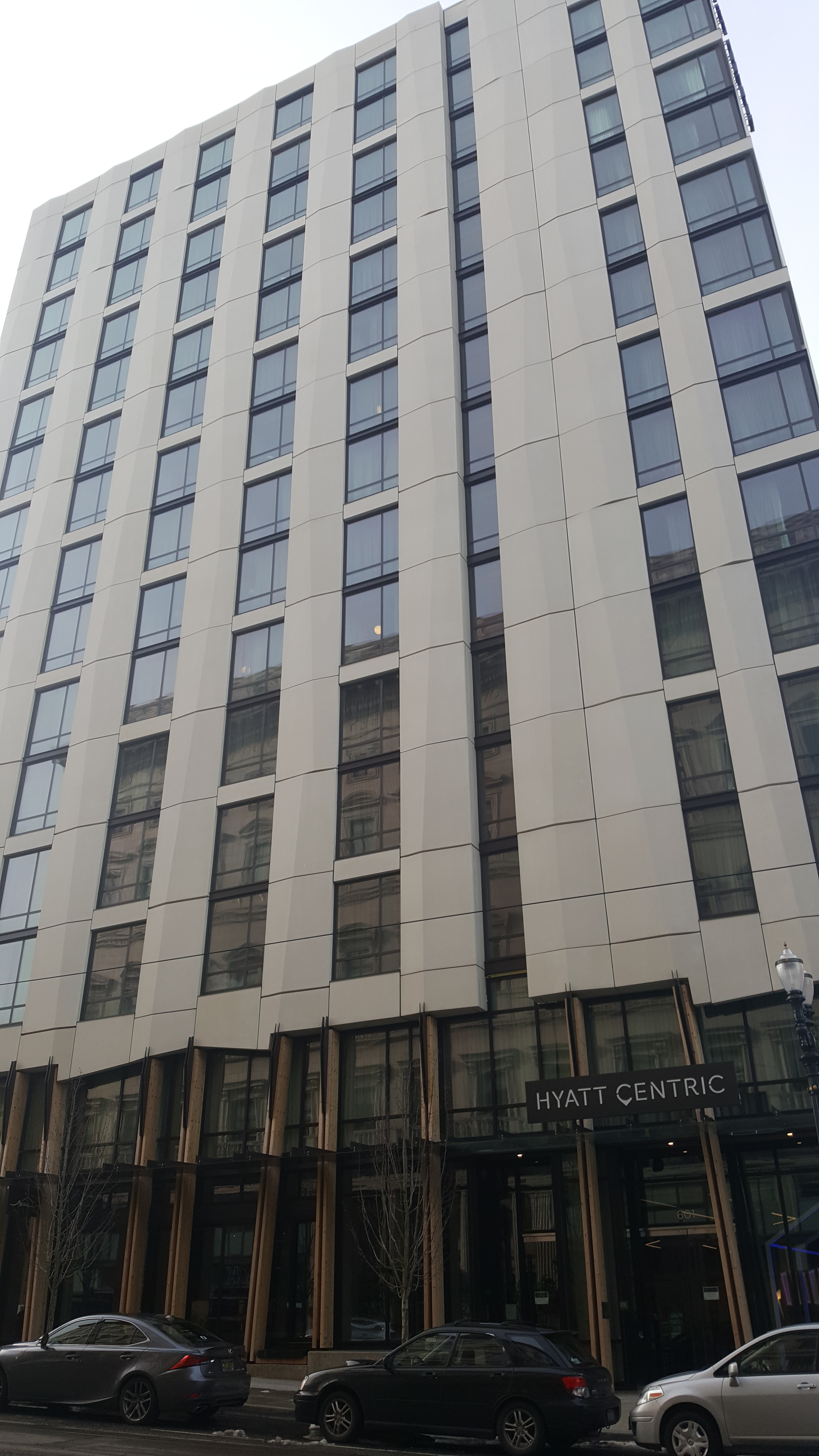
- The hotel's exterior in 2021
- Interactive map of the Hyatt Centric Downtown Portland area

General information
- Location: Portland, Oregon, United States
- Coordinates: 45.520833°N 122.682778°W

The Hyatt Centric Downtown Portland is a hotel in Portland, Oregon. The 15-story hotel at the intersection of Southwest 11th Avenue and Alder Street in downtown Portland opened in 2020 and has 220 rooms. It was designed by SERA Architects and built on property purchased from United Way of the Columbia-Willamette in 2015. The hotel topped out in May 2019, The Portland hotel marks the first in Hyatt's Centric brand. Liberty Hotel Investments owns the property.

The restaurant Masia was housed in the building. Masia opened in February 2020. Plans to close permanently were confirmed in March 2021.
