= Public Kitchen & Bar =

Tapas restaurant in Ontario, Canada

- Interactive map of Public Kitchen & Bar

Restaurant information
- Established: 2013
- Owners: Carly Blasutti and Ryan Murphy
- Food type: Spanish
- Location: 300 Victoria St. N., Kitchener, Ontario, Canada
- Coordinates: 43.45858°N 80.48410°W

Public Kitchen & Bar (stylized as PUBLIC Kitchen & Bar) is a tapas-style bistro in Kitchener, Ontario, Canada, located at 300 Victoria St. N. The restaurant began as a catering business, before opening its first brick-and-mortar location in 2013. The restaurant is owned by Carly Blasutti and Ryan Murphy. In 2017, the restaurant moved to a much larger location. The menu frequently changes, and consists of tapas-style shareable plates. The food is mainly Spanish cuisine, but takes inspiration from a variety of other cuisines.

== History ==
Public Kitchen & Bar began as a basement catering business. The restaurant is owned by Carly Blasutti (who runs the front of house) and Ryan Murphy (who is the head chef). They opened the restaurant's first location in 2013, at 295-b Lancaster St. W. It was small, with nine tables, and 26 seats. They opened a small store called Public Market at 324 Frederick St. in 2015, but it has since closed. In November 2017, the restaurant moved from Lancaster St. to its current Victoria St. location, which was much larger, with three times more seating. With the move, the menu was rebuilt with a Spanish focus. During the April 2020 COVID-19 lockdowns, the restaurant became takeout-only. During this time, the restaurant was "hanging on by a thread" according to Blasutt.

== Menu ==
The menu is regularly changed, and consists of tapas-style shareable plates. Example dishes include beef tartare, scallops, and roasted eggplant. The smoked salmon with rösti is a local favourite and stays permanently on the menu. The menu is mainly inspired by Spanish cuisine but also fuses with other cuisines, for example, Southeast Asian cuisine or Indian cuisine.

== Reception ==
In 2013, Leigh Clarkson of The Record praised the restaurant's cheap prices, atmosphere, and menu. Caroline Aksich, writing for the travel guide Frommer's, praised the restaurant's food, drink list, and ambience. Ryan Murphy of The Record reviewed the restaurant in 2017; Murphy praised the food and atmosphere, but found it too cozy at times, and was mixed on some of the dishes. Murphy gave the restaurant a score of 3 out of 4 possible "forks". In 2017, Kristen Philippi of the Community Edition praised the atmosphere and service, and said the restaurant "made a definite mark in the Kitchener-Waterloo food scene".
