= Toro Bravo (restaurant) =

Defunct restaurant in Portland, Oregon, US

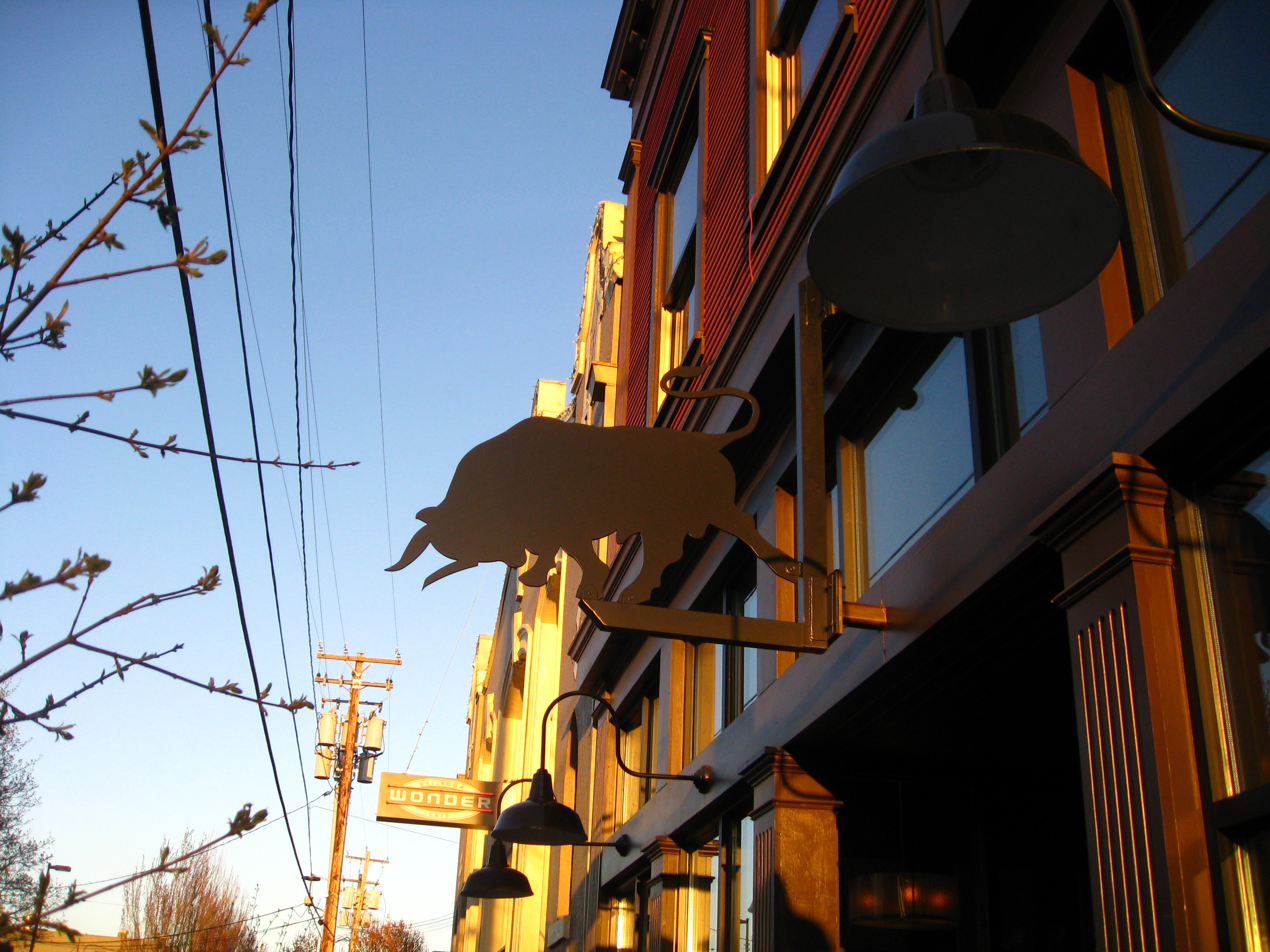
- The restaurant's exterior, 2008
- Interactive map of Toro Bravo

Restaurant information
- Established: 2007
- Food type: Spanish
- Location: 120 NE Russell Street, Portland, Oregon, 97212, United States
- Coordinates: 45°32′26.5″N 122°39′49.2″W

Toro Bravo was a Spanish restaurant in Portland, Oregon, US from 2007 to 2020.

== History ==
Toro Bravo opened in 2007.

The restaurant had received funding to provide food for the homeless community.

== Reception ==
Toro Bravo was named one of the city's best restaurants by Portland Monthly's Camas Davis in 2007 and by The Oregonian's Michael Russell in 2016. The restaurant ranked number 23 on Russell's 2019 list of "Portland's 40 best restaurants".

== See also ==
- Hispanics and Latinos in Portland, Oregon
- Impact of the COVID-19 pandemic on the restaurant industry in the United States
- List of Spanish restaurants
