= Scotch Lodge =

Bar in Portland, Oregon, U.S.

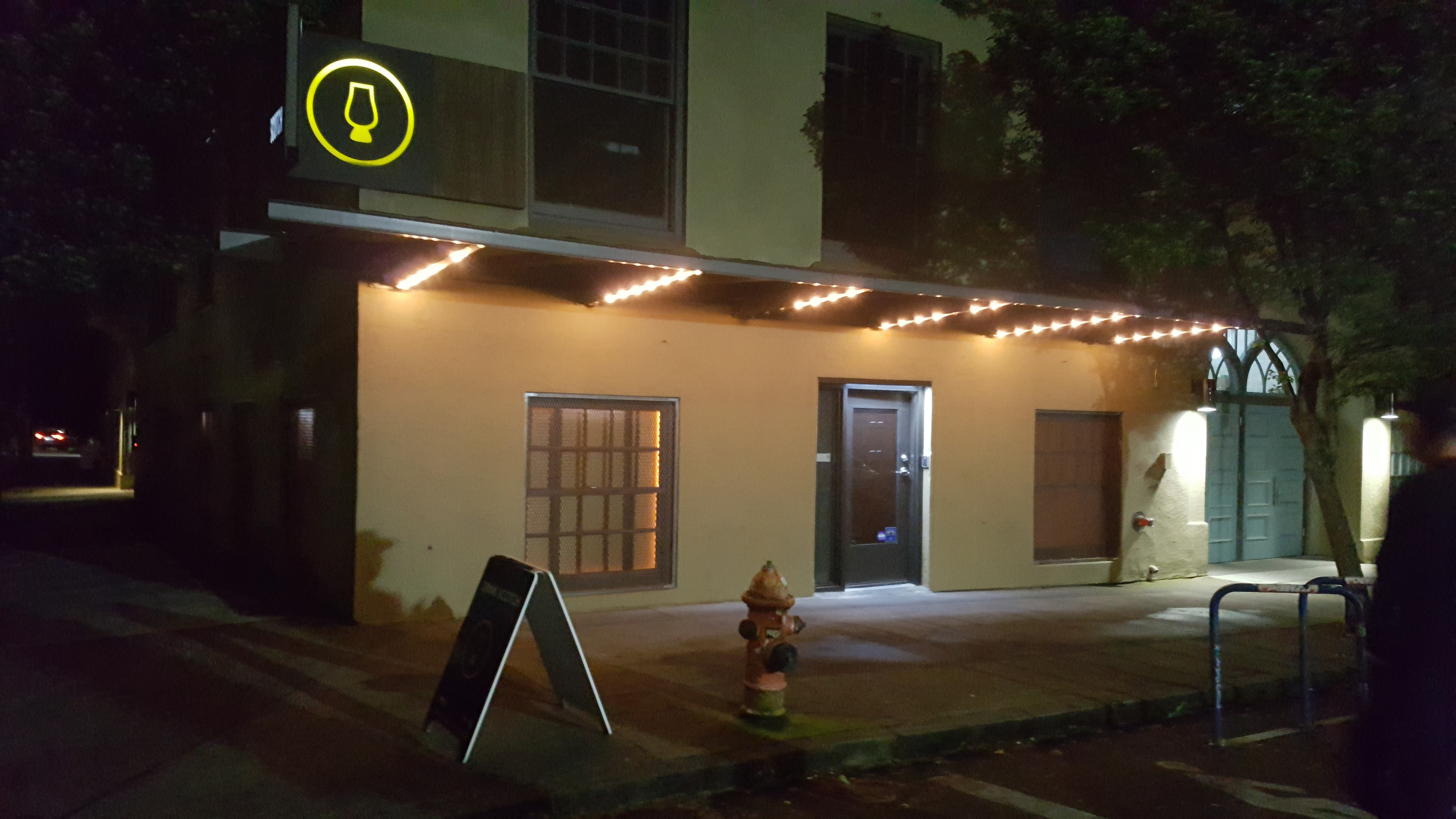
- The bar's exterior at night, 2022
- Interactive map of Scotch Lodge

Restaurant information
- Location: 215 Southeast 9th Avenue #102, Portland, Multnomah, Oregon, 97214, United States
- Coordinates: 45°31′17″N 122°39′25″W
- Website: scotchlodge.com

Scotch Lodge is a bar in Portland, Oregon, United States. It was named one of the best bars in the United States by Esquire.

== Description ==
The bar Scotch Lodge operates in southeast Portland's Buckman neighborhood. It carries approximately 300 domestic and international whiskeys. The food menu has "Modern French-inspired" options such as sticks of pumpernickel-battered fried Brie.

The interior has wood and bronze accents.

== History ==
Scotch Lodge opened in 2019, in the space that previously housed Japanese restaurant Biwa.

== Reception ==
Scotch Lodge was Portland Monthly's Bar of the Year in 2019. Alex Frane included the business in the magazine's 2025 list of the city's best bars.

Katrina Yentch included Scotch Lodge in Eater Portland's 2025 overview of the best restaurants in Buckman. Michael Russell included the business in The Oregonian's 2025 list of the 21 best restaurants in southeast Portland. He also ranked Scotch Lodge number 26 in the newspaper's 2025 list of Portland's 40 best restaurants.
