= Never Coffee =

Coffee company based in Portland, Oregon, U.S.

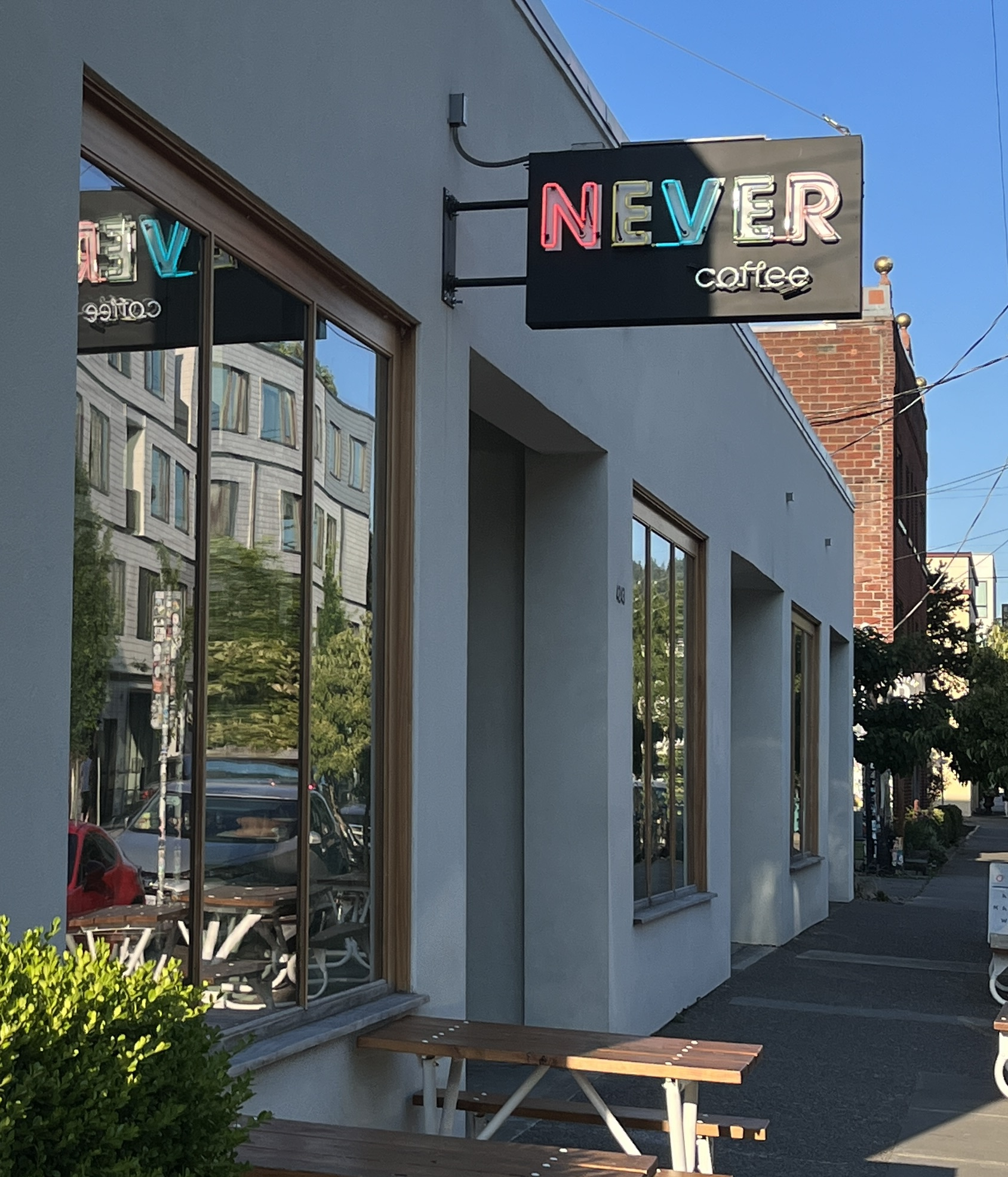
- Exterior of the original shop in southeast Portland's Sunnyside neighborhood, 2022
- Interactive map of Never Coffee

Restaurant information
- Location: Portland, Multnomah, Oregon, United States
- Coordinates: 45.5167°N 122.6187°W
- Website: nevercoffeelab.com

Never Coffee (also known as Never Coffee Lab, or simply Never) is a coffee company based in Portland, Oregon, United States. The business has two shops: the original location is in southeast Portland's Sunnyside neighborhood and an outpost operates in downtown Portland.

== Description ==
Never Coffee operates two brick and mortar locations in Portland, Oregon, and bills itself as a "coffee lab". Portland Monthly has said Never is known for its "colorful shops and creative lattes".

In southeast Portland, the business operates along Belmont Street in the Sunnyside neighborhood. The small shop "balances monochrome with pops of color", according to Portland Monthly. The Oregonian has described the cafe as hip".

The downtown location has hosted disc jockeys.

=== Menu ===
Never serves hot and iced coffee and espresso drinks, as well as pastries. Latte varieties include one with ginger and turmeric and another with dulce de leche. The Hug Latte is infused with cacao, chilis, and cinnamon and the Holy Grail has cherrywood smoked honey, pepper, and sea salt. Never also serves a Rosewater-Cardamon Latte.

Among syrup flavors is Midnight Oil, which includes black licorice, fennel seed, and star anise.

== History ==
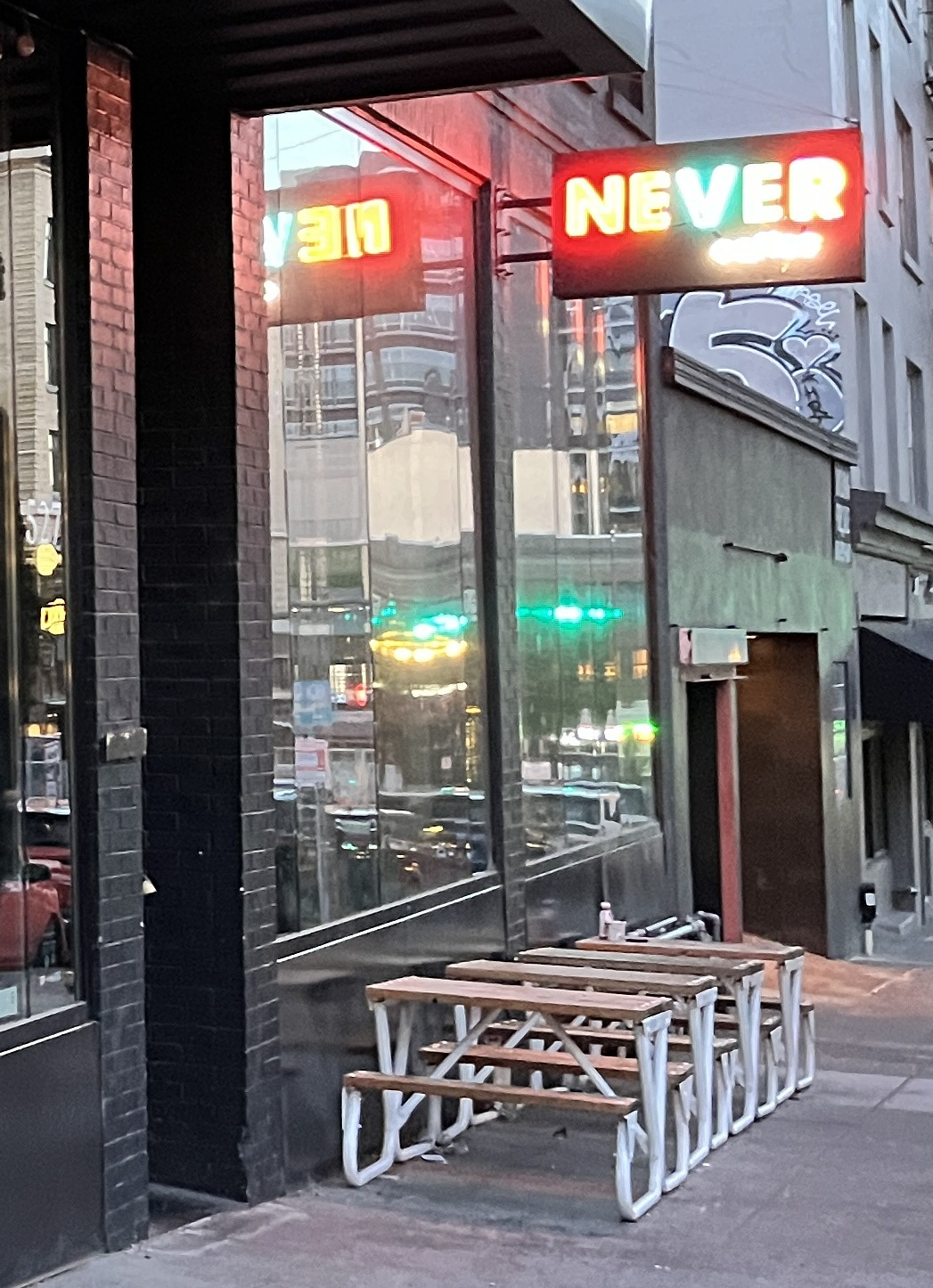
Exterior of the location in downtown Portland in 2022

The original location is in Sunnyside and the downtown location opened in 2019.

== Reception ==
Hannah Wallace included Never in Condé Nast Traveler's 2018 list of Portland's fourteen best coffee shops. Anna McClow of The La Salle Falconer, a student publication for La Salle High School in Milwaukie, included the business in a 2019 list of five "trendy" coffee shops in Portland. She said the Sunnyside location is "full of color, and has good quality coffee". Portland Monthly included Never in a 2023 "definitive guide" to the city's best independent coffee shops. In 2022, Matt Kirouac included the business in Tasting Table's list of thirteen "uniquely strange Portland restaurants". Lindsay D. Mattison ranked Never fourth in the website's 2023 overview of the city's fifteen best coffee shops.

The Portland Mercury called Never "innovative" in 2023. Chloë Nannestad selected Never to represent Oregon in Reader's Digest's 2024 overview of the best coffee shops in each U.S. state. Nannestad called the business a "quintessential Portland destination" and recommended the Flowers blend. Katrina Yentch included Never in Eater Portland's 2024 overview of recommended eateries along Belmont Street. Noms Magazine included Never in a 2024 of Portland's twelve best coffee shops. Saveur included the Flowers blend in a 2025 list of Portland's twelve best culinary souvenirs.
