= Ataula =

Restaurant in Portland, Oregon, U.S.

- Interactive map of Ataula

Restaurant information
- Established: 2013
- Closed: April 2021
- Food type: Spanish; Catalan
- Location: Portland, Oregon, United States
- Coordinates: 45.5358°N 122.6997°W

Ataula was a Spanish and Catalan restaurant in Portland, Oregon, in the United States. The restaurant earned Jose Chesa a James Beard Foundation Award nomination in the Best Chef: Northwest category.

== Description ==
Ataula was a Spanish and Catalan restaurant on 21st Avenue in northwest Portland's Northwest District. Lonely Planet described the business as an "upmarket eatery offering a modern take on traditional Spanish tapas".

The menu included a version of patatas bravas called Nuestras Bravas, rabbit paella, ribs ibérico, chorizo lollipops, cod fritters, and coca bread with olive oil and shredded tomato. The restaurant also served octopus carpaccio and cured salmon with mascarpone yogurt and black truffle honey. Michael Russell of The Oregonian described the rossejat negre as "toasted and squid-ink-blackened noodles topped with a healthy scoop of roast garlic alioli". For Burger Week, the restaurant served a tapas-style beef hamburger.

On the drink menu, the El Greco Tonica had gin and the La Moreneta was "made with mezcal bitter blend, vermút and flamed orange", according to Willamette Week.

== History ==
The restaurant opened in 2013, in a space which previously housed Patanegra. Guy Fieri visited the restaurant on Diners, Drive-Ins and Dives.

Owners confirmed plans to close permanently in April 2021, during the COVID-19 pandemic. The space was later occupied by the Thai restaurant Phuket Cafe.

== Reception ==
In 2014, Micheal C. Zusman of Willamette Week wrote, "In recent months, Ataula has sharpened its angle of ascent, breaking into the ranks of Portland's elite restaurants. The floor staff is among the best in town; the kitchen kills it every night, getting dishes properly cooked and out quickly; and, my oh my, the food." The restaurant earned Jose Chesa a James Beard Foundation Award nomination in the Best Chef: Northwest category. Michael Russell included Ataula in The Oregonian's 2017 lists of the city's 40 best restaurants, ten best restaurants in northwest Portland, and ten best Spanish restaurants in the city. Larry Bleiberg included the business in USA Today's 2018 list of "great places" to try a Moscow mule.

== See also ==
- COVID-19 pandemic in Portland, Oregon
- Hispanics and Latinos in Portland, Oregon
- Impact of the COVID-19 pandemic on the food industry
- Impact of the COVID-19 pandemic on the restaurant industry in the United States
- List of Spanish restaurants
