= Biwa (restaurant) =

Defunct Japanese restaurant in Portland, Oregon, U.S.

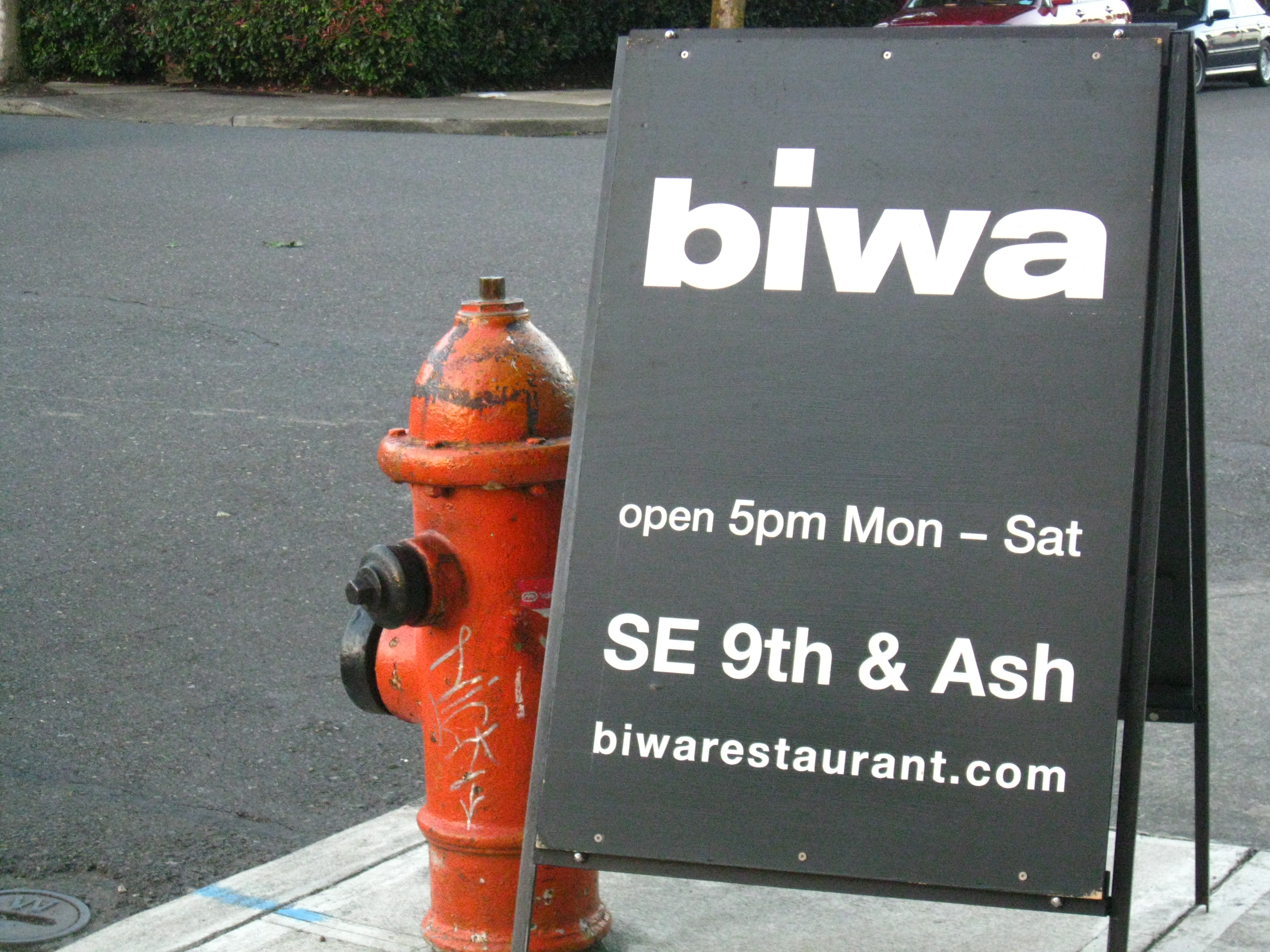
- Interactive map of Biwa

Restaurant information
- Established: 2007
- Closed: 2018
- Owners: Gabe Rosen; Kina Voelz
- Head chef: Gabe Rosen
- Food type: Japanese
- Location: 215 Southeast 9th Avenue, Portland, Multnomah, Oregon, 97214, United States
- Coordinates: 45.5214°N 122.6569°W

Biwa was an izakaya in Portland, Oregon.

== Description ==
The restaurant served Japanese cuisine including ramen, sashimi, and udon noodles.

== History ==
Biwa opened in 2007. In 2013, the restaurant began implementing a five percent surcharge to "provide health insurance and living wages" for all staff.

In 2016, Biwa relocated and "split" within the same building, becoming Parasol Bar and the Japanese restaurant Biwa Izakaya. Parasol closed in 2017. Owners Gabe Rosen and Kina Voelz announced plans to close the restaurant in mid 2018.

"Spin-offs" from Biwa included Kotori and Noraneko.

== See also ==
- List of Japanese restaurants
