= Shin Sushi =

Japanese restaurant in Encino, California, US

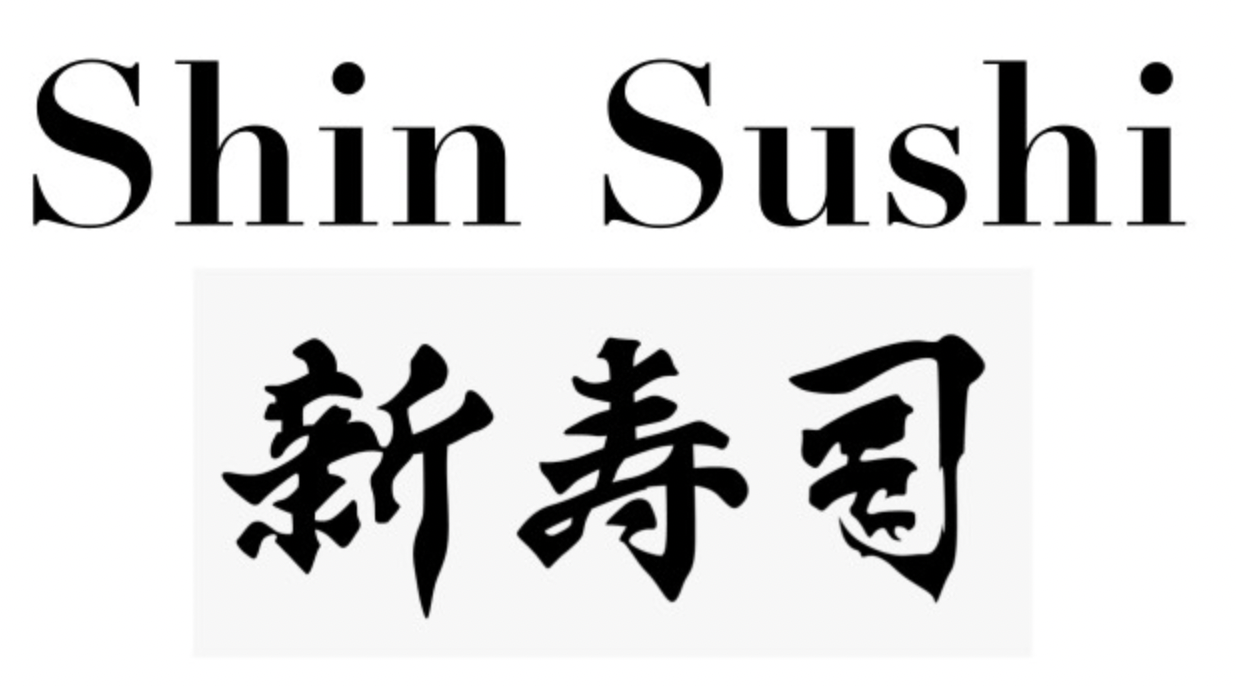
- Interactive map of Shin Sushi

Restaurant information
- Established: July 2018
- Owner: Taketoshi Azumi
- Head chef: Taketoshi Azumi
- Food type: Japanese Omakase
- Rating: (Michelin Guide)
- Location: 16573 Ventura Boulevard, Los Angeles - Encino, California, 91436, United States
- Coordinates: 34°9′31.5″N 118°29′39.5″W
- Seating capacity: 8-seat counter
- Reservations: Required

Shin Sushi is a Michelin-starred sushi restaurant in Encino, California.

== Overview ==
Chef Azumi previously worked at other Los Angeles-based sushi spots including Asanebo, Mori Sushi, and Sushi of Gari Hollywood. The omakase dinner typically is 12 to 14 pieces of nigiri along with miso soup. A 2019 review by the Los Angeles Times called Shin Sushi, "a sushi bar experience stripped to its essence."

== See also ==
- List of Japanese restaurants
- List of Michelin-starred restaurants in California
