= Mori Nozomi =

Japanese restaurant in Los Angeles, California, U.S.

- Interactive map of Mori Nozomi

Restaurant information
- Established: March 7, 2024
- Head chef: Nozomi Mori
- Food type: Japanese
- Rating: (Michelin Guide)
- Location: 11500 W. Pico Blvd., Los Angeles, California, 90064, United States
- Coordinates: 34°2′0″N 118°26′32″W
- Seating capacity: 8-seat counter
- Website: morinozomi.com

Mori Nozomi is a Michelin-starred Japanese, sushi restaurant in Los Angeles, California, United States that offers a 22-25 course omakase menu. The all-female team offers seasonal fish sourced from the Toyosu market and seasonal vegetables chosen from the Santa Monica Farmers Market.

Although it occupies the location previously occupied by Mori Sushi and has a similar name, there is no relation between the two restaurants.

== See also ==
- List of Japanese restaurants
- List of Michelin-starred restaurants in California
