= Shibumi =

Shibumi may refer to:

- Shibui, Japanese aesthetics, the noun form of which is shibumi
- Shibumi (novel), 1979 novel by Trevanian
- Shibumi (restaurant), a Michelin-starred restaurant in Los Angeles, California
