= Al's Place =

Al's Place may refer to:

- Al's Place (restaurant), a New American restaurant in San Francisco
- "Al's Place" (song), a 1965 single by Al Hirt
