= List of Michelin-starred restaurants in California =

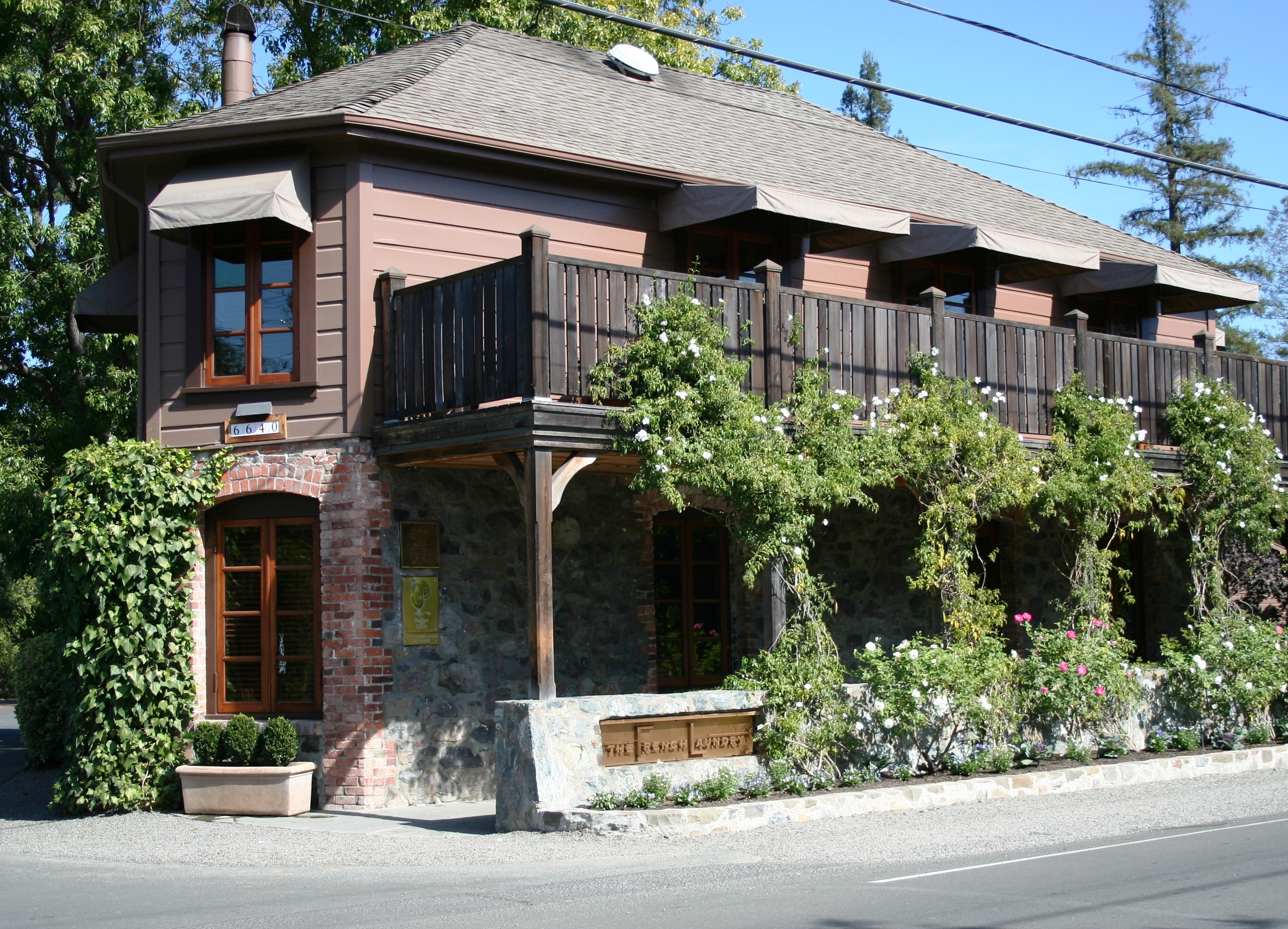
The French Laundry, a 3 Michelin-starred restaurant in Yountville, California

As of the 2026 Michelin Guide, there are 83 restaurants in California that hold a Michelin star.

The Michelin Guides have been published by the French tire company Michelin since 1900. They were designed as a guide to tell drivers about eateries they recommended to visit and to subtly sponsor their tires, by encouraging drivers to use their cars more and therefore need to replace the tires as they wore out. Over time, the stars that were given out started to become more valuable.

Multiple anonymous Michelin inspectors visit the restaurants several times. They rate the restaurants on five criteria: "quality of products", "mastery of flavor and cooking techniques", "the personality of the chef represented in the dining experience", "value for money", and "consistency between inspectors' visits". Inspectors have at least ten years of expertise and create a list of popular restaurants supported by media reports, reviews, and diner popularity. If they reach a consensus, Michelin awards restaurants from one to three stars based on its evaluation methodology: One star means "high-quality cooking, worth a stop", two stars signify "excellent cooking, worth a detour", and three stars denote "exceptional cuisine, worth a special journey". The stars are not permanent and restaurants are constantly being re-evaluated. If the criteria are not met, the restaurant will lose its stars.

California has a long history of renowned chefs along with having its own style of cuisine. Early California chefs such as Julia Child, Alice Waters, and Sally Schmitt helped shape the food and dining scene in California. By the 1980s, chefs like Wolfgang Puck further shaped California cuisine. In the 2000s chefs such as Thomas Keller and Nancy Silverton continued to shape Northern and Southern California.

The dining scene in California continues to have a strong influence on food and dining. Long-standing 3-star restaurants such as The French Laundry and Benu offer some of the top rated restaurants in the world. As of 2026, more 3-star restaurants are in California than any other region in North America.

The California Guide came about in 2019 as the result of the merger of two other ones; San Francisco and Los Angeles. The San Francisco Michelin Guide was the second North American city chosen to have its own Michelin Guide beginning in 2007. Unlike the other U.S. guides which focus mainly in the city proper, the San Francisco guide included all the major cities in the Bay Area: San Francisco, Oakland, San Jose and Berkeley, as well as Wine Country, which includes Napa and Sonoma. Michelin published restaurant guides for Los Angeles in 2008 and 2009 but suspended the publication in 2010. In 2019 Michelin replaced the San Francisco guide with a statewide guide which would bring back the Los Angeles market along with the rest of Southern California and included Northern California as well. Due to the COVID-19 pandemic and wildfires in California, the French tire company's restaurant guide for California took a hiatus in 2020.

== 2019–2026 statewide lists ==
Beginning in 2019, the Michelin Guide covers the entire state of California. Due to the COVID-19 pandemic and wildfires in California, the French tire company's restaurant guide took a hiatus in California in 2020.

=== Northern California ===
Key
1 Michelin star	One Michelin star
2 Michelin stars	Two Michelin stars
3 Michelin stars	Three Michelin stars
—	The restaurant did not receive a star that year
Closed	The restaurant is no longer open

Michelin-starred restaurants
Name	Cuisine	Location	2019	2020 No Guide	2021	2022	2023	2024	2025	2026
7 Adams	Californian	San Francisco – Japantown	—		—	—	—	1 Michelin star	1 Michelin star	1 Michelin star
Acquerello	Italian	San Francisco – Polk Gulch	2 Michelin stars		2 Michelin stars	2 Michelin stars	2 Michelin stars	2 Michelin stars	2 Michelin stars	2 Michelin stars
Adega	Portuguese, Californian	San Jose	—		1 Michelin star	1 Michelin star	—	Closed	—	—
AL's Place	Californian	San Francisco – Mission District	1 Michelin star		1 Michelin star	Closed				
Angler	Contemporary, Seafood	San Francisco – Financial District	1 Michelin star		1 Michelin star	1 Michelin star	1 Michelin star	1 Michelin star	1 Michelin star	1 Michelin star
Aphotic	Seafood	San Francisco – SoMa	—		—	—	1 Michelin star	1 Michelin star	Closed	
Atelier Crenn	Contemporary	San Francisco – Cow Hollow	3 Michelin stars		3 Michelin stars	3 Michelin stars	3 Michelin stars	3 Michelin stars	3 Michelin stars	3 Michelin stars
Auberge du Soleil	Californian	Rutherford	1 Michelin star		1 Michelin star	1 Michelin star	1 Michelin star	1 Michelin star	1 Michelin star	1 Michelin star
Aubergine	Contemporary, Californian	Monterey	1 Michelin star		1 Michelin star	1 Michelin star	1 Michelin star	2 Michelin stars	2 Michelin stars	2 Michelin stars
Auro	Contemporary, French	Calistoga	—		—	—	1 Michelin star	1 Michelin star	1 Michelin star	1 Michelin star
Avery	New American	San Francisco – Fillmore	—		1 Michelin star	1 Michelin star	Closed			
Bar Crenn (Note: Le Comptoir at Bar Crenn, specifically had the Michelin star)	Contemporary	San Francisco – Cow Hollow	1 Michelin star		1 Michelin star	1 Michelin star	1 Michelin star	1 Michelin star	1 Michelin star	—
Barndiva	Californian	Healdsburg	—		1 Michelin star	1 Michelin star	1 Michelin star	—	—	—
Baumé	French	Palo Alto	2 Michelin stars		—	—	Closed			
Benu	Asian	San Francisco – SoMa	3 Michelin stars		3 Michelin stars	3 Michelin stars	3 Michelin stars	3 Michelin stars	3 Michelin stars	3 Michelin stars
Birdsong	Contemporary	San Francisco – SoMa	1 Michelin star		2 Michelin stars	2 Michelin stars	2 Michelin stars	2 Michelin stars	2 Michelin stars	2 Michelin stars
Bouchon	French	Yountville	1 Michelin star		—	—	—	—	—	—
Californios	Mexican, Contemporary	San Francisco – Mission District	2 Michelin stars		2 Michelin stars	2 Michelin stars	2 Michelin stars	2 Michelin stars	2 Michelin stars	3 Michelin stars
Campton Place	Californian	San Francisco – Union Square	2 Michelin stars		2 Michelin stars	Temporarily closed	—	—	—	—
Chez Noir	Contemporary	Carmel-by-the-Sea	—		—	—	—	1 Michelin star	1 Michelin star	1 Michelin star
Chez TJ	Contemporary	Mountain View	1 Michelin star		1 Michelin star	1 Michelin star	1 Michelin star	1 Michelin star	—	Closed
Coi	Californian-French	San Francisco – North Beach	2 Michelin stars		2 Michelin stars	Closed				
Commis	Contemporary	Oakland	2 Michelin stars		2 Michelin stars	2 Michelin stars	2 Michelin stars	2 Michelin stars	2 Michelin stars	2 Michelin stars
Commonwealth	American	San Francisco – Mission District	1 Michelin star	Closed						
Cyrus	Californian	Geyserville	—		—	1 Michelin star	1 Michelin star	1 Michelin star	1 Michelin star	1 Michelin star
Enclos	Californian	Sonoma	—		—	—	—	—	2 Michelin stars	3 Michelin stars
Farmhouse Inn & Restaurant	Californian	Forestville	1 Michelin star		—	—	—	—	Temporarily closed	—
Gary Danko	Contemporary	San Francisco – North Beach	1 Michelin star		1 Michelin star	1 Michelin star	1 Michelin star	—	—	—
Harbor House	Californian	Elk	1 Michelin star		2 Michelin stars	2 Michelin stars	2 Michelin stars	2 Michelin stars	2 Michelin stars	2 Michelin stars
Hashiri	Japanese	San Francisco – SoMa	1 Michelin star		Temporarily closed		—	—	—	Temporarily closed
Hilda and Jesse	American	San Francisco – North Beach	—		—	—	—	1 Michelin star	1 Michelin star	1 Michelin star
In Situ	Haute	San Francisco – SoMa	—		Closed					
Jū-Ni	Japanese	San Francisco – North Panhandle	1 Michelin star		1 Michelin star	—	—	—	—	—
Keiko à Nob Hill	Japanese-influenced French	San Francisco – Nob Hill	1 Michelin star		Closed					
Kenzo	Japanese	Napa	1 Michelin star		1 Michelin star	1 Michelin star	1 Michelin star	1 Michelin star	1 Michelin star	—
Kiln	Contemporary	San Francisco – Hayes Valley	—		—	—	—	1 Michelin star	2 Michelin stars	2 Michelin stars
Kin Khao	Thai	San Francisco – Union Square	1 Michelin star		1 Michelin star	1 Michelin star	1 Michelin star	1 Michelin star	1 Michelin star	1 Michelin star
Kinjo	Japanese	San Francisco – Russian Hill	1 Michelin star		Closed					
La Toque	Contemporary	Napa	1 Michelin star		1 Michelin star	—	—	—	—	—
Lazy Bear	Contemporary	San Francisco – Mission District	2 Michelin stars		2 Michelin stars	2 Michelin stars	2 Michelin stars	2 Michelin stars	2 Michelin stars	2 Michelin stars
Localis	Californian	Sacramento	—		—	1 Michelin star	1 Michelin star	1 Michelin star	1 Michelin star	1 Michelin star
Lord Stanley	Californian-European	San Francisco – Russian Hill	1 Michelin star		Closed		—	—	Closed	
Luce	Mediterranean	San Francisco – SoMa	1 Michelin star		—	—	—	—	Closed	
Madcap	Contemporary	San Anselmo	1 Michelin star		1 Michelin star	1 Michelin star	1 Michelin star	1 Michelin star	1 Michelin star	1 Michelin star
Madera	Contemporary	Menlo Park	1 Michelin star		1 Michelin star	—	—	—	—	—
Madrona Manor	Californian	Healdsburg	1 Michelin star		—	—	—	—	—	—
Manresa	New American	Los Gatos	3 Michelin stars		3 Michelin stars	Closed				
Marlena	American	San Francisco – Bernal Heights	—		1 Michelin star	1 Michelin star	Closed			
Maum	Korean	Palo Alto	1 Michelin star		Closed					
Michael Mina	New American	San Francisco – Financial District	1 Michelin star		Closed					
Mister Jiu's	Chinese	San Francisco – Chinatown	1 Michelin star		1 Michelin star	1 Michelin star	1 Michelin star	1 Michelin star	1 Michelin star	1 Michelin star
Mourad	Moroccan	San Francisco – SoMa	1 Michelin star		1 Michelin star	—	—	—	Closed	
Naides	Filipino	San Francisco – Nob Hill	—		—	—	—	—	—	1 Michelin star
Nari	Thai	San Francisco – Japantown	—		—	—	1 Michelin star	1 Michelin star	1 Michelin star	1 Michelin star
Nico	Californian	San Francisco – Financial District	1 Michelin star		Closed					
Niku Steakhouse	Steakhouse	San Francisco – SoMa	—		1 Michelin star	1 Michelin star	1 Michelin star	1 Michelin star	1 Michelin star	1 Michelin star
Nisei	Japanese	San Francisco – Russian Hill	—		—	1 Michelin star	1 Michelin star	1 Michelin star	1 Michelin star	1 Michelin star
O’ by Claude Le Tohic	French	San Francisco – Financial District	—		1 Michelin star	1 Michelin star	1 Michelin star	1 Michelin star	1 Michelin star	—
Octavia	Californian	San Francisco – Lower Pacific Heights	1 Michelin star		—	—	—	—	—	—
Omakase	Japanese	San Francisco – SoMa	1 Michelin star		1 Michelin star	1 Michelin star	—	—	—	—
Osito	Contemporary	San Francisco – Mission District	—		—	1 Michelin star	1 Michelin star	1 Michelin star	Closed	
Plumed Horse	Contemporary	Saratoga	1 Michelin star		1 Michelin star	1 Michelin star	1 Michelin star	1 Michelin star	1 Michelin star	1 Michelin star
Press	Modern	St. Helena	—		—	1 Michelin star	1 Michelin star	1 Michelin star	1 Michelin star	1 Michelin star
Protegé	Contemporary	Palo Alto	1 Michelin star		1 Michelin star	1 Michelin star	1 Michelin star	1 Michelin star	1 Michelin star	1 Michelin star
Quince	Contemporary	San Francisco – Jackson Square	3 Michelin stars		3 Michelin stars	3 Michelin stars	3 Michelin stars	3 Michelin stars	3 Michelin stars	3 Michelin stars
Rasa	Indian	Burlingame	1 Michelin star		1 Michelin star	—	Closed		—	—
Rich Table	Californian	San Francisco – Hayes Valley	1 Michelin star		—	—	—	—	—	—
Saison	Californian	San Francisco – SoMa	2 Michelin stars		2 Michelin stars	2 Michelin stars	2 Michelin stars	2 Michelin stars	2 Michelin stars	2 Michelin stars
San Ho Won	Korean	San Francisco – Mission District	—		—	1 Michelin star	1 Michelin star	1 Michelin star	1 Michelin star	1 Michelin star
SingleThread	Contemporary	Healdsburg	3 Michelin stars		3 Michelin stars	3 Michelin stars	3 Michelin stars	3 Michelin stars	3 Michelin stars	3 Michelin stars
Selby's Restaurant	American	Atherton	—		1 Michelin star	1 Michelin star	1 Michelin star	1 Michelin star	1 Michelin star	1 Michelin star
The Shota	Japanese	San Francisco – Financial District	—		1 Michelin star	1 Michelin star	1 Michelin star	1 Michelin star	1 Michelin star	Closed
Six Test Kitchen	Contemporary	Paso Robles	—		—	—	—	—	1 Michelin star	1 Michelin star
Sons & Daughters	Contemporary	San Francisco – Nob Hill	1 Michelin star		1 Michelin star	1 Michelin star	1 Michelin star	2 Michelin stars	2 Michelin stars	2 Michelin stars
Sorrel	Contemporary	San Francisco – Lower Pacific Heights	1 Michelin star		1 Michelin star	1 Michelin star	1 Michelin star	1 Michelin star	1 Michelin star	1 Michelin star
SPQR	Italian	San Francisco – Fillmore	1 Michelin star		1 Michelin star	—	—	—	—	—
Spruce	Californian	San Francisco – Presidio Heights	1 Michelin star		1 Michelin star	1 Michelin star	—	—	—	—
Ssal	Korean	San Francisco - Russian Hill	—		—	1 Michelin star	1 Michelin star	1 Michelin star	1 Michelin star	1 Michelin star
State Bird Provisions	Californian	San Francisco – Fillmore	1 Michelin star		1 Michelin star	1 Michelin star	1 Michelin star	1 Michelin star	1 Michelin star	1 Michelin star
Sun Moon Studio	Californian	Oakland	—		—	—	—	—	1 Michelin star	1 Michelin star
Sushi Shin	Japanese	Redwood City	—		1 Michelin star	1 Michelin star	1 Michelin star	—	—	—
Sushi Yoshizumi	Japanese	San Mateo	1 Michelin star		1 Michelin star	1 Michelin star	1 Michelin star	—	—	—
The French Laundry	Contemporary	Yountville	3 Michelin stars		3 Michelin stars	3 Michelin stars	3 Michelin stars	3 Michelin stars	3 Michelin stars	3 Michelin stars
The Kitchen	Californian	Sacramento	1 Michelin star		1 Michelin star	1 Michelin star	1 Michelin star	1 Michelin star	1 Michelin star	1 Michelin star
The Progress	Californian	San Francisco – Fillmore	1 Michelin star		1 Michelin star	1 Michelin star	1 Michelin star	1 Michelin star	1 Michelin star	1 Michelin star
The Restaurant at Justin	Californian	Paso Robles	—		—	1 Michelin star	1 Michelin star	1 Michelin star	1 Michelin star	1 Michelin star
The Restaurant at Meadowood	Californian	St. Helena	3 Michelin stars		Closed					
The Village Pub	Contemporary	Woodside	1 Michelin star		1 Michelin star	1 Michelin star	1 Michelin star	1 Michelin star	1 Michelin star	1 Michelin star
Troubador	French Californian	Healdsburg	—		—	—	—	—	—	1 Michelin star
Wako	Japanese	San Francisco – Richmond District	1 Michelin star		1 Michelin star	—	—	—	—	—
Wakuriya	Japanese	San Mateo	1 Michelin star		1 Michelin star	1 Michelin star	1 Michelin star	1 Michelin star	1 Michelin star	1 Michelin star
Wolfsbane	Contemporary	San Francisco – Dogpatch	—		—	—	—	—	—	1 Michelin star
Reference										

=== Southern California ===
Key
1 Michelin star	One Michelin star
2 Michelin stars	Two Michelin stars
3 Michelin stars	Three Michelin stars
—	The restaurant did not receive a star that year
Closed	The restaurant is no longer open

Michelin-starred restaurants
Name	Cuisine	Location	2019	2020 No Guide	2021	2022	2023	2024	2025	2026
715	Japanese	Los Angeles – Arts District	—		—	1 Michelin star	1 Michelin star	1 Michelin star	1 Michelin star	—
Addison	Contemporary	San Diego	1 Michelin star		2 Michelin stars	3 Michelin stars	3 Michelin stars	3 Michelin stars	3 Michelin stars	3 Michelin stars
Bell's	French	Los Alamos	—		1 Michelin star	1 Michelin star	1 Michelin star	1 Michelin star	1 Michelin star	1 Michelin star
Bistro Na's	Chinese	Temple City	1 Michelin star		1 Michelin star	—	—	—	—	—
Camphor	French	Los Angeles – Arts District	—		—	1 Michelin star	1 Michelin star	1 Michelin star	1 Michelin star	—
Caruso's	Californian	Montecito	—		—	—	1 Michelin star	1 Michelin star	1 Michelin star	1 Michelin star
Citrin	Californian	Santa Monica	—		—	1 Michelin star	1 Michelin star	1 Michelin star	.	1 Michelin star
Corridor 109	Asian	Los Angeles – Hollywood	—		—	—	—	—	—	1 Michelin star
CUT by Wolfgang Puck	American, Steakhouse	Beverly Hills	1 Michelin star		1 Michelin star	—	—	—	—	—
Dialogue	American	Santa Monica	1 Michelin star	Closed						
Gucci Osteria da Massimo Bottura	Italian	Beverly Hills	—		1 Michelin star	1 Michelin star	1 Michelin star	1 Michelin star	Closed	
Gwen	American	Los Angeles – Hollywood	—		—	1 Michelin star	1 Michelin star	1 Michelin star	1 Michelin star	—
Hana re	Japanese	Costa Mesa	1 Michelin star		1 Michelin star	1 Michelin star	1 Michelin star	1 Michelin star	—	—
Hatchet Hall	New American	Culver City	—		—	1 Michelin star	—	—	—	—
Hayato	Japanese	Los Angeles – Arts District	1 Michelin star		2 Michelin stars	2 Michelin stars	2 Michelin stars	2 Michelin stars	2 Michelin stars	2 Michelin stars
Heritage	Californian	Long Beach – Rose Park	—		—	—	1 Michelin star	1 Michelin star	1 Michelin star	1 Michelin star
Holbox	Mexican	Los Angeles – South Los Angeles	—		—	—	—	1 Michelin star	1 Michelin star	1 Michelin star
Jeune et Jolie	French	Carlsbad	—		1 Michelin star	1 Michelin star	1 Michelin star	1 Michelin star	1 Michelin star	1 Michelin star
Kali	Steakhouse (Note: In July 2025, the cuisine changed from a California tasting menu to a Steakhouse)	Los Angeles – Hollywood	1 Michelin star		1 Michelin star	1 Michelin star	1 Michelin star	1 Michelin star	1 Michelin star	1 Michelin star
Kato	Asian	Los Angeles – Arts District	1 Michelin star		1 Michelin star	1 Michelin star	1 Michelin star	1 Michelin star	1 Michelin star	2 Michelin stars
Kojima	Japanese	Los Angeles – Sawtelle	—		—	—	—	—	—	1 Michelin star
Knife Pleat	French	Costa Mesa – South Coast Metro	—		1 Michelin star	1 Michelin star	1 Michelin star	1 Michelin star	1 Michelin star	—
Le Comptoir	Vegetarian	Los Angeles – Koreatown	1 Michelin star		1 Michelin star	—	—	—	—	—
Lielle	Californian	Los Angeles – Beverlywood	—		—	—	—	—	—	1 Michelin star
Lilo	Californian	Carlsbad	—		—	—	—	—	1 Michelin star	1 Michelin star
Lucien	Californian	La Jolla	—		—	—	—	—	—	1 Michelin star
Manzke	Contemporary	Los Angeles – Westside	—		—	1 Michelin star	1 Michelin star	Closed		
Maude	Californian	Beverly Hills	1 Michelin star		1 Michelin star	1 Michelin star	1 Michelin star	Closed		
Mélisse	Seafood	Santa Monica	Temporarily Closed		2 Michelin stars	2 Michelin stars	2 Michelin stars	2 Michelin stars	2 Michelin stars	2 Michelin stars
Meteora	Creative	Los Angeles – Hollywood	—		—	—	—	1 Michelin star	1 Michelin star	1 Michelin star
Miura	Sushi	Beverly Hills	—		—	—	—	—	—	1 Michelin star
Mori Nozomi	Japanese	Los Angeles – South Robertson	—		—	—	—	—	1 Michelin star	1 Michelin star
Mori Sushi	Japanese	Los Angeles – South Robertson	1 Michelin star		1 Michelin star	—	—	—	Closed	
Morihiro	Japanese	Los Angeles – Echo Park (Note: The original location was in Atwater Village, Los Angeles but relocated in 2025 to Echo Park)	1 Michelin star		1 Michelin star	1 Michelin star	1 Michelin star	1 Michelin star	1 Michelin star	—
n/naka	Japanese	Los Angeles – Palms	2 Michelin stars		2 Michelin stars	2 Michelin stars	2 Michelin stars	1 Michelin star	1 Michelin star	1 Michelin star
Nozawa Bar	Japanese	Beverly Hills	1 Michelin star		1 Michelin star	1 Michelin star	1 Michelin star	1 Michelin star	1 Michelin star	1 Michelin star
Orsa & Winston	Asian	Los Angeles – Downtown	1 Michelin star		1 Michelin star	1 Michelin star	1 Michelin star	1 Michelin star	1 Michelin star	1 Michelin star
Osteria Mozza	Italian	Los Angeles – Hollywood	1 Michelin star		1 Michelin star	1 Michelin star	1 Michelin star	1 Michelin star	1 Michelin star	1 Michelin star
Pasjoli	French	Santa Monica	—		1 Michelin star	—	—	—	—	—
Pasta | Bar	New American	Los Angeles – Encino	—		1 Michelin star	1 Michelin star	1 Michelin star	1 Michelin star	1 Michelin star	1 Michelin star
Phenakite	Asian	Los Angeles – Hollywood	—		1 Michelin star	1 Michelin star	Closed			
Providence	Seafood	Los Angeles – Hollywood	2 Michelin stars		2 Michelin stars	2 Michelin stars	2 Michelin stars	2 Michelin stars	3 Michelin stars	3 Michelin stars
Q Sushi	Japanese	Los Angeles – Downtown	1 Michelin star		1 Michelin star	1 Michelin star	1 Michelin star	—	—	—
Restaurant Ki	Korean	Los Angeles – Little Tokyo	—		—	—	—	—	1 Michelin star	1 Michelin star
Rebel Omakase	Japanese	Laguna Beach	—		—	—	—	1 Michelin star	1 Michelin star	1 Michelin star
Rustic Canyon	American, Californian	Santa Monica	1 Michelin star		1 Michelin star	—	—	—	—	—
Seline	Californian	Santa Monica	—		—	—	—	—	—	1 Michelin star
Shibumi	Japanese	Los Angeles – Downtown	1 Michelin star		1 Michelin star	1 Michelin star	1 Michelin star	1 Michelin star	Closed	
Shin Sushi	Japanese	Los Angeles – Encino	1 Michelin star		1 Michelin star	1 Michelin star	1 Michelin star	1 Michelin star	1 Michelin star	1 Michelin star
Shunji	Japanese	Santa Monica (Note: The original location in 2012 was West Los Angeles but relocated in 2021 to Santa Monica)	1 Michelin star		—	—	—	—	—	—
Silvers Omakase	Japanese	Santa Barbara	—		—	—	—	—	1 Michelin star	1 Michelin star
Soichi	Japanese	San Diego	—		1 Michelin star	1 Michelin star	1 Michelin star	1 Michelin star	1 Michelin star	1 Michelin star
Somni	Molecular Gastronomy	West Hollywood (Note: The original location in 2019 was Beverly Hills but upon reopening in 2024 it is now in West Hollywood)	2 Michelin stars	Closed					3 Michelin stars	3 Michelin stars
Sushi Ginza Onodera	Japanese	West Hollywood	2 Michelin stars		2 Michelin stars	2 Michelin stars	2 Michelin stars	1 Michelin star	Closed	
Sushi Inaba	Japanese	Torrance	—		1 Michelin star	1 Michelin star	1 Michelin star	1 Michelin star	1 Michelin star	1 Michelin star
Sushi Kaneyoshi	Japanese	Los Angeles – Little Tokyo	—		—	—	1 Michelin star	1 Michelin star	1 Michelin star	1 Michelin star
Sushi Tadokoro	Japanese	San Diego	—		1 Michelin star	1 Michelin star	1 Michelin star	—	—	—
Taco María	Mexican	Costa Mesa	1 Michelin star		1 Michelin star	1 Michelin star	Closed			
Trois Mec	French	Los Angeles – Hollywood	1 Michelin star	Closed						
Uka	Japanese	Los Angeles – Hollywood	—		—	—	—	1 Michelin star	1 Michelin star	Closed
Urasawa	Japanese	Beverly Hills	2 Michelin stars	Closed						
Valle	Mexican	Oceanside	—		—	—	1 Michelin star	1 Michelin star	1 Michelin star	—
Vespertine	Contemporary	Culver City	2 Michelin stars		2 Michelin stars	—	—	2 Michelin stars	2 Michelin stars	2 Michelin stars
Reference										

== 2008–2009 Los Angeles lists ==
Key
1 Michelin star	One Michelin star
2 Michelin stars	Two Michelin stars
—	The restaurant did not receive a star that year
Closed	The restaurant is no longer open

The Michelin Guide suspended guides for the Los Angeles area in 2010 "due to the economic environment".

Michelin-starred restaurants
Name	Cuisine	Location	2008	2009	2010–2018 No Guide
Asanebo	Japanese	Los Angeles – Studio City	1 Michelin star	1 Michelin star	
Bastide	French	West Hollywood	—	1 Michelin star	Closed
CUT by Wolfgang Puck	American, Steakhouse	Beverly Hills	1 Michelin star	1 Michelin star	
Hatfield's	American	Los Angeles – Hollywood	—	1 Michelin star	Closed
Joe's Restaurant	New American	Los Angeles – Venice	1 Michelin star	—	Closed
La Botte	Italian	Santa Monica	1 Michelin star	1 Michelin star	Closed
The Dining Room at the Langham Huntington	Contemporary	Pasadena	1 Michelin star	1 Michelin star	
Matsuhisa	Japanese	Beverly Hills	1 Michelin star	—	
Mélisse	Seafood	Santa Monica	2 Michelin stars	2 Michelin stars	
Mori Sushi	Japanese	Los Angeles – Sawtelle	1 Michelin star	1 Michelin star	
Ortolan	French	Los Angeles	1 Michelin star	1 Michelin star	Closed
Osteria Mozza	Italian	Los Angeles – Hollywood	—	1 Michelin star	
Patina	French, American	Los Angeles – Downtown	1 Michelin star	1 Michelin star	
Providence	Seafood	Los Angeles – Hollywood	1 Michelin star	2 Michelin stars	
Saddle Peak Lodge	American, Californian	Calabasas	1 Michelin star	—	
Sona	French	West Hollywood	1 Michelin star	1 Michelin star	Closed
Spago	Californian	Beverly Hills	2 Michelin stars	2 Michelin stars	
Sushi Zo	Japanese	Los Angeles – Downtown	—	1 Michelin star	
Trattoria Tre Venezie	Italian	Pasadena	1 Michelin star	1 Michelin star	Closed
Urasawa	Japanese	Beverly Hills	2 Michelin stars	2 Michelin stars	
Valentino	Italian	Santa Monica	1 Michelin star	1 Michelin star	Closed
Water Grill	American, Seafood	Los Angeles – Downtown	1 Michelin star	1 Michelin star	
Reference					

== 2007–2018 San Francisco Bay Area and Wine Country lists ==
Key
1 Michelin star	One Michelin star
2 Michelin stars	Two Michelin stars
3 Michelin stars	Three Michelin stars
—	The restaurant did not receive a star that year
Closed	The restaurant is no longer open

Michelin-starred restaurants
Name	Cuisine	Location	2007	2008	2009	2010	2011	2012	2013	2014	2015	2016	2017	2018
Acquerello	Italian	Nob Hill	1 Michelin star	1 Michelin star	1 Michelin star	1 Michelin star	1 Michelin star	1 Michelin star	1 Michelin star	1 Michelin star	2 Michelin stars	2 Michelin stars	2 Michelin stars	2 Michelin stars
Adega	Portuguese	San Jose	—	—	—	—	—	—	—	—	—	—	1 Michelin star	1 Michelin star
Alexander's Steakhouse	Steakhouse	Cupertino	—	—	—	—	1 Michelin star	1 Michelin star	1 Michelin star	—	—	—	—	—
All Spice	Californian	San Mateo	—	—	—	—	—	—	1 Michelin star	1 Michelin star	1 Michelin star	1 Michelin star	—	—
AL's Place	Californian	Mission	—	—	—	—	—	—	—	—	—	1 Michelin star	1 Michelin star	1 Michelin star
Ame	New American	SoMa	—	1 Michelin star	1 Michelin star	1 Michelin star	1 Michelin star	1 Michelin star	1 Michelin star	1 Michelin star	1 Michelin star	1 Michelin star	Closed	
Applewood Inn	Haute	Guerneville	—	—	—	1 Michelin star	1 Michelin star	—	—	—	Closed			
Aster	Californian	Mission	—	—	—	—	—	—	—	—	—	1 Michelin star	1 Michelin star	—
Atelier Crenn	Contemporary	Cow Hollow	—	—	—	—	—	1 Michelin star	2 Michelin stars	2 Michelin stars	2 Michelin stars	2 Michelin stars	2 Michelin stars	2 Michelin stars
Aqua	Seafood	Financial District	2 Michelin stars	2 Michelin stars	2 Michelin stars	Closed								
Auberge du Soleil	Californian	Rutherford	1 Michelin star	1 Michelin star	1 Michelin star	1 Michelin star	1 Michelin star	1 Michelin star	1 Michelin star	1 Michelin star	1 Michelin star	1 Michelin star	1 Michelin star	1 Michelin star
Aziza	Moroccan	Richmond District	—	—	—	1 Michelin star	1 Michelin star	1 Michelin star	1 Michelin star	1 Michelin star	1 Michelin star	1 Michelin star	1 Michelin star	—
Baumé	French	Palo Alto	—	—	—	—	1 Michelin star	2 Michelin stars	2 Michelin stars	2 Michelin stars	2 Michelin stars	2 Michelin stars	2 Michelin stars	2 Michelin stars
Benu	Asian	SoMa	—	—	—	—	—	2 Michelin stars	2 Michelin stars	2 Michelin stars	3 Michelin stars	3 Michelin stars	3 Michelin stars	3 Michelin stars
Bistro Jeanty	French	Yountville	1 Michelin star	1 Michelin star	1 Michelin star	—	—	—	—	—	—	—	—	—
Bouchon	French	Yountville	1 Michelin star	1 Michelin star	1 Michelin star	1 Michelin star	1 Michelin star	1 Michelin star	1 Michelin star	1 Michelin star	1 Michelin star	1 Michelin star	1 Michelin star	1 Michelin star
Boulevard	American	SoMa	1 Michelin star	1 Michelin star	1 Michelin star	1 Michelin star	1 Michelin star	1 Michelin star	1 Michelin star	1 Michelin star	1 Michelin star	—	—	—
Bushi-Tei	California-Asian	Japantown	—	1 Michelin star	—	—	—	Closed						
Californios	Mexican	Mission	—	—	—	—	—	—	—	—	—	1 Michelin star	1 Michelin star	2 Michelin stars
Campton Place	Californian	Union Square	—	—	—	—	1 Michelin star	1 Michelin star	1 Michelin star	1 Michelin star	1 Michelin star	2 Michelin stars	2 Michelin stars	1 Michelin star
Chez Panisse	Californian	Berkeley	1 Michelin star	1 Michelin star	1 Michelin star	1 Michelin star	—	—	—	—	—	—	—	—
Chez TJ	Contemporary	Mountain View	1 Michelin star	2 Michelin stars	1 Michelin star	1 Michelin star	1 Michelin star	1 Michelin star	1 Michelin star	1 Michelin star	1 Michelin star	1 Michelin star	1 Michelin star	1 Michelin star
Coi	Californian-French	North Beach	—	1 Michelin star	2 Michelin stars	2 Michelin stars	2 Michelin stars	2 Michelin stars	2 Michelin stars	2 Michelin stars	2 Michelin stars	2 Michelin stars	3 Michelin stars	3 Michelin stars
Commis	Contemporary	Oakland	—	—	—	1 Michelin star	1 Michelin star	1 Michelin star	1 Michelin star	1 Michelin star	1 Michelin star	2 Michelin stars	2 Michelin stars	2 Michelin stars
Commonwealth	American	Mission	—	—	—	—	—	—	—	—	—	1 Michelin star	1 Michelin star	1 Michelin star
Cortez	New American	Financial District	—	1 Michelin star	Closed									
Cyrus	Californian	Healdsburg	2 Michelin stars	2 Michelin stars	2 Michelin stars	2 Michelin stars	2 Michelin stars	2 Michelin stars	Closed					
Dio Deka	Greek	Los Gatos	—	—	—	—	1 Michelin star	1 Michelin star	—	—	—	—	—	—
Dry Creek Kitchen	New American	Healdsburg	1 Michelin star	—	—	—	—	—	—	—	—	—	—	—
El Paseo	New American	Mill Valley	—	—	—	1 Michelin star	—	—	—	—	—	—	—	Closed
Étoile	Californian	Yountville	—	—	—	1 Michelin star	1 Michelin star	1 Michelin star	—	—	Closed			
Farmhouse Inn & Restaurant	Californian	Forestville	1 Michelin star	1 Michelin star	1 Michelin star	1 Michelin star	1 Michelin star	1 Michelin star	1 Michelin star	1 Michelin star	1 Michelin star	1 Michelin star	1 Michelin star	1 Michelin star
Fifth Floor	American, French	SoMa	1 Michelin star	1 Michelin star	1 Michelin star	1 Michelin star	—	—	—	Closed				
Fleur de Lys	French	Financial District	1 Michelin star	1 Michelin star	1 Michelin star	1 Michelin star	1 Michelin star	1 Michelin star	—	Closed				
Frances	Californian	Castro	—	—	—	—	1 Michelin star	1 Michelin star	1 Michelin star	—	—	—	—	—
Gary Danko	Contemporary	North Beach	1 Michelin star	1 Michelin star	1 Michelin star	1 Michelin star	1 Michelin star	1 Michelin star	1 Michelin star	1 Michelin star	1 Michelin star	1 Michelin star	1 Michelin star	1 Michelin star
Hashiri	Japanese	SoMa	—	—	—	—	—	—	—	—	—	—	1 Michelin star	1 Michelin star
In Situ	Haute	SoMa	—	—	—	—	—	—	—	—	—	—	—	1 Michelin star
Jū-Ni	Japanese	North Panhandle	—	—	—	—	—	—	—	—	—	—	1 Michelin star	1 Michelin star
K&L Bistro	French	Sebastopol	1 Michelin star	1 Michelin star	—	—	—	—	—	—	—	—	—	—
Keiko à Nob Hill	Japanese-influenced French	Nob Hill	—	—	—	—	—	—	1 Michelin star	1 Michelin star	1 Michelin star	1 Michelin star	1 Michelin star	1 Michelin star
Kenzo	Japanese	Napa Valley	—	—	—	—	—	—	—	—	—	—	—	1 Michelin star
Kin Khao	Thai	Union Square	—	—	—	—	—	—	—	—	—	1 Michelin star	1 Michelin star	1 Michelin star
Kinjo	Japanese	Russian Hill	—	—	—	—	—	—	—	—	—	—	—	1 Michelin star
Kusakabe	Japanese	Financial District	—	—	—	—	—	—	—	—	1 Michelin star	1 Michelin star	—	—
La Costanera	Peruvian	Montara	—	—	—	—	—	1 Michelin star	1 Michelin star	—	—	—	—	—
La Folie	French	Russian Hill	1 Michelin star	1 Michelin star	1 Michelin star	1 Michelin star	1 Michelin star	1 Michelin star	1 Michelin star	1 Michelin star	1 Michelin star	—	—	—
La Toque	French	Napa	—	—	—	1 Michelin star	1 Michelin star	1 Michelin star	1 Michelin star	1 Michelin star	1 Michelin star	1 Michelin star	1 Michelin star	1 Michelin star
Lazy Bear	New American	Mission	—	—	—	—	—	—	—	—	—	1 Michelin star	2 Michelin stars	2 Michelin stars
Lord Stanley	Californian-European	Nob Hill	—	—	—	—	—	—	—	—	—	1 Michelin star	1 Michelin star	1 Michelin star
Luce	Mediterranean	SoMa	—	—	—	1 Michelin star	1 Michelin star	1 Michelin star	1 Michelin star	1 Michelin star	1 Michelin star	1 Michelin star	1 Michelin star	1 Michelin star
Madera	Contemporary	Menlo Park	—	—	—	1 Michelin star	1 Michelin star	1 Michelin star	1 Michelin star	1 Michelin star	1 Michelin star	—	1 Michelin star	1 Michelin star
Madrona Manor	Californian	Healdsburg	—	1 Michelin star	1 Michelin star	1 Michelin star	1 Michelin star	1 Michelin star	1 Michelin star	1 Michelin star	1 Michelin star	1 Michelin star	1 Michelin star	1 Michelin star
Manresa	New American	Los Gatos	2 Michelin stars	2 Michelin stars	2 Michelin stars	2 Michelin stars	2 Michelin stars	2 Michelin stars	2 Michelin stars	2 Michelin stars	2 Michelin stars	3 Michelin stars	3 Michelin stars	3 Michelin stars
Martini House	New American	St. Helena	—	1 Michelin star	1 Michelin star	Closed								
Maruya	Japanese	Mission	—	—	—	—	—	—	—	—	1 Michelin star	—	—	—
Masa's	French	Nob Hill	1 Michelin star	1 Michelin star	1 Michelin star	1 Michelin star	1 Michelin star	1 Michelin star	Closed					
Michael Mina	New American	Financial District	2 Michelin stars	2 Michelin stars	2 Michelin stars	1 Michelin star	—	1 Michelin star	1 Michelin star	1 Michelin star	1 Michelin star	1 Michelin star	1 Michelin star	1 Michelin star
Mirepoix	French	Windsor	—	—	—	—	1 Michelin star	Closed						
Mister Jiu's	Chinese	Chinatown	—	—	—	—	—	—	—	—	—	—	1 Michelin star	1 Michelin star
Mosu	New American	Fillmore	—	—	—	—	—	—	—	—	—	—	1 Michelin star	—
Mourad	Moroccan	SoMa	—	—	—	—	—	—	—	—	—	1 Michelin star	1 Michelin star	1 Michelin star
Murray Circle	American	Sausalito	—	—	1 Michelin star	1 Michelin star	1 Michelin star	—	—	—	—	—	—	—
Nico	Californian	Pacific Heights	—	—	—	—	—	—	—	—	—	1 Michelin star	1 Michelin star	—
Octavia	Californian	Lower Pacific Heights	—	—	—	—	—	—	—	—	—	1 Michelin star	1 Michelin star	1 Michelin star
Omakase	Japanese	SoMa	—	—	—	—	—	—	—	—	—	1 Michelin star	1 Michelin star	1 Michelin star
One Market	New American	SoMa	—	1 Michelin star	1 Michelin star	1 Michelin star	1 Michelin star	1 Michelin star	—	—	—	—	—	—
Plumed Horse	Contemporary	Saratoga	—	—	1 Michelin star	1 Michelin star	1 Michelin star	1 Michelin star	1 Michelin star	1 Michelin star	1 Michelin star	1 Michelin star	1 Michelin star	1 Michelin star
Quince	Contemporary	Jackson Square	1 Michelin star	1 Michelin star	1 Michelin star	1 Michelin star	1 Michelin star	1 Michelin star	1 Michelin star	2 Michelin stars	2 Michelin stars	2 Michelin stars	3 Michelin stars	3 Michelin stars
Range	American	Mission	1 Michelin star	1 Michelin star	1 Michelin star	1 Michelin star	—	—	—	—	—	—	Closed	
Rasa	Indian	Burlingame	—	—	—	—	—	—	—	—	—	1 Michelin star	1 Michelin star	1 Michelin star
Rich Table	New American	Hayes Valley	—	—	—	—	—	—	—	—	—	—	—	1 Michelin star
Redd	American	Yountville	—	1 Michelin star	1 Michelin star	1 Michelin star	1 Michelin star	1 Michelin star	1 Michelin star	1 Michelin star	—	—	—	Closed
Rubicon	New American	Financial District	1 Michelin star	1 Michelin star	Closed									
Saison	Californian	SoMa	—	—	—	—	1 Michelin star	2 Michelin stars	2 Michelin stars	2 Michelin stars	3 Michelin stars	3 Michelin stars	3 Michelin stars	3 Michelin stars
Sante	French	Sonoma	—	—	—	1 Michelin star	1 Michelin star	1 Michelin star	—	—	—	—	—	—
SingleThread	Contemporary	Healdsburg	—	—	—	—	—	—	—	—	—	—	—	2 Michelin stars
Solbar	American	Calistoga	—	—	—	1 Michelin star	1 Michelin star	1 Michelin star	1 Michelin star	1 Michelin star	1 Michelin star	1 Michelin star	1 Michelin star	—
Sons & Daughters	Contemporary	Nob Hill	—	—	—	—	—	1 Michelin star	1 Michelin star	1 Michelin star	1 Michelin star	1 Michelin star	1 Michelin star	1 Michelin star
SPQR	Italian	Fillmore	—	—	—	—	—	—	1 Michelin star	1 Michelin star	1 Michelin star	1 Michelin star	1 Michelin star	1 Michelin star
Spruce	Californian	Presidio Heights	—	—	—	—	1 Michelin star	1 Michelin star	1 Michelin star	1 Michelin star	1 Michelin star	1 Michelin star	1 Michelin star	1 Michelin star
State Bird Provisions	Californian	Fillmore	—	—	—	—	—	—	—	1 Michelin star	1 Michelin star	1 Michelin star	1 Michelin star	1 Michelin star
Sushi Ran	Japanese	Sausalito	1 Michelin star	1 Michelin star	—	—	—	—	—	—	—	—	—	—
Sushi Yoshizumi	Japanese	San Mateo	—	—	—	—	—	—	—	—	—	1 Michelin star	1 Michelin star	1 Michelin star
Terra	American	St. Helena	—	1 Michelin star	1 Michelin star	1 Michelin star	1 Michelin star	1 Michelin star	1 Michelin star	1 Michelin star	1 Michelin star	1 Michelin star	1 Michelin star	1 Michelin star
Terrapin Creek	American	Bodega Bay	—	—	—	—	—	1 Michelin star	1 Michelin star	1 Michelin star	1 Michelin star	1 Michelin star	1 Michelin star	1 Michelin star
The Dining Room at the Ritz-Carlton	New American	Nob Hill	1 Michelin star	1 Michelin star	1 Michelin star	1 Michelin star	1 Michelin star	Closed						
The French Laundry	Contemporary	Yountville	3 Michelin stars	3 Michelin stars	3 Michelin stars	3 Michelin stars	3 Michelin stars	3 Michelin stars	3 Michelin stars	3 Michelin stars	3 Michelin stars	3 Michelin stars	3 Michelin stars	3 Michelin stars
The Progress	Californian	Fillmore District	—	—	—	—	—	—	—	—	—	—	1 Michelin star	—
The Restaurant at Meadowood	Californian	St. Helena	—	2 Michelin stars	2 Michelin stars	2 Michelin stars	3 Michelin stars	3 Michelin stars	3 Michelin stars	3 Michelin stars	3 Michelin stars	3 Michelin stars	3 Michelin stars	3 Michelin stars
The Village Pub	Contemporary	Woodside	—	—	—	1 Michelin star	1 Michelin star	1 Michelin star	1 Michelin star	1 Michelin star	1 Michelin star	1 Michelin star	1 Michelin star	1 Michelin star
Trevese	New American	Los Gatos	—	—	—	1 Michelin star	Closed							
Ubuntu	Vegetarian	Napa	—	—	—	1 Michelin star	1 Michelin star	1 Michelin star	Closed					
Wako	Japanese	Richmond District	—	—	—	—	—	—	—	—	—	1 Michelin star	1 Michelin star	1 Michelin star
Wakuriya	Japanese	San Mateo	—	—	—	—	1 Michelin star	1 Michelin star	1 Michelin star	1 Michelin star	1 Michelin star	1 Michelin star	1 Michelin star	1 Michelin star
Reference														

== See also ==
- List of restaurants
- List of Michelin 3-star restaurants in the United States
- Lists of Michelin-starred restaurants

== Bibliography ==
- Michelin Guide San Francisco Bay Area & Wine Country 2007. Michelin Travel Publications. 2007. ISBN 978-2-06-712084-6.
- Michelin Guide Los Angeles 2008. Michelin Travel Publications. 2008. ISBN 978-2-06-712990-0.
- Michelin Guide San Francisco Bay Area & Wine Country 2008. Michelin Travel Publications. 2008. ISBN 978-2-06-712985-6.
- Michelin Guide Los Angeles 2009. Michelin Travel Publications. 2009. ISBN 978-2-06-713708-0.
- Michelin Guide San Francisco Bay Area & Wine Country 2009. Michelin Travel Publications. 2009. ISBN 978-2-06-713707-3.
- Michelin Guide San Francisco Bay Area & Wine Country 2010. Michelin Travel Publications. 2010. ISBN 978-2-06-714694-5.
- Michelin Guide San Francisco Bay Area & Wine Country 2011. Michelin Travel Publications. 2011. ISBN 978-2-06-715336-3.
- Michelin Guide San Francisco Bay Area & Wine Country 2012. Michelin Travel Publications. 2012. ISBN 978-2-06-716529-8.
- Michelin Guide San Francisco Bay Area & Wine Country 2013. Michelin Travel Publications. 2013. ISBN 978-2-06-717693-5.
- Michelin Guide San Francisco Bay Area & Wine Country 2014. Michelin Travel Publications. 2014. ISBN 978-2-06-718697-2.
- Michelin Guide San Francisco Bay Area & Wine Country 2015. Michelin Travel Publications. 2015. ISBN 978-2-06-719411-3.
- Michelin Guide San Francisco Bay Area & Wine Country 2016. Michelin Travel Publications. 2016. ISBN 978-2-06-720298-6.
- Michelin Guide San Francisco Bay Area & Wine Country 2017. Michelin Travel Publications. 2017. ISBN 978-2-06-721237-4.
- Michelin Guide San Francisco Bay Area & Wine Country 2018. Michelin Travel Publications. 2018. ISBN 978-2-06-722092-8.
- Michelin Guide California 2019. Michelin Travel Publications. 2019. ISBN 978-2-06-724129-9.
