= Kinjo =

Japanese restaurant in San Francisco, California, U.S.

- Interactive map of Kinjo

Restaurant information
- Food type: Japanese
- Location: 2206 Polk Street, San Francisco, California, 94109, United States
- Coordinates: 37°47′49.6″N 122°25′18.8″W

Kinjo was a Japanese restaurant in Russian Hill, San Francisco, in the U.S. state of California.

The restaurant received a Michelin star.

The restaurant closed in 2017 due to flooding from neighbors above the restaurant. It reopened in June 2018 after a 7-month closure however during the closure, founding chef, Takatoshi Toshi departed to open another sushi restaurant. Chef Tujii Tahahiro was billed as "guest chef".

Saru Sushi Bar would replace Kinjo.

== See also ==
- List of Japanese restaurants
- List of Michelin-starred restaurants in California
