= Heritage (restaurant) =

Restaurant in Long Beach, California, U.S.

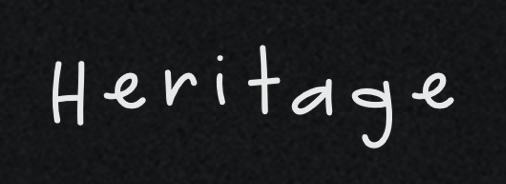
- Interactive map of Heritage

Restaurant information
- Owners: Philip Pretty and Lauren Pretty
- Head chef: Philip Pretty
- Food type: American; California
- Rating: (Michelin Guide)
- Location: 2032 E 7th Street, Long Beach, California, 90804, United States
- Coordinates: 33°46′30.5″N 118°10′0.5″W
- Other information: 6-course tasting menu only
- Website: heritagerestaurant.fullbellyfoodgroup.com

Heritage is a Michelin-starred restaurant in Long Beach, California. The restaurant serves California / American cuisine in the Rose Park neighborhood.

Heritage is the first Long Beach restaurant to be awarded a Michelin star.

== See also ==
- List of Michelin-starred restaurants in California
