= Rich Table =

Restaurant in San Francisco, California, U.S.

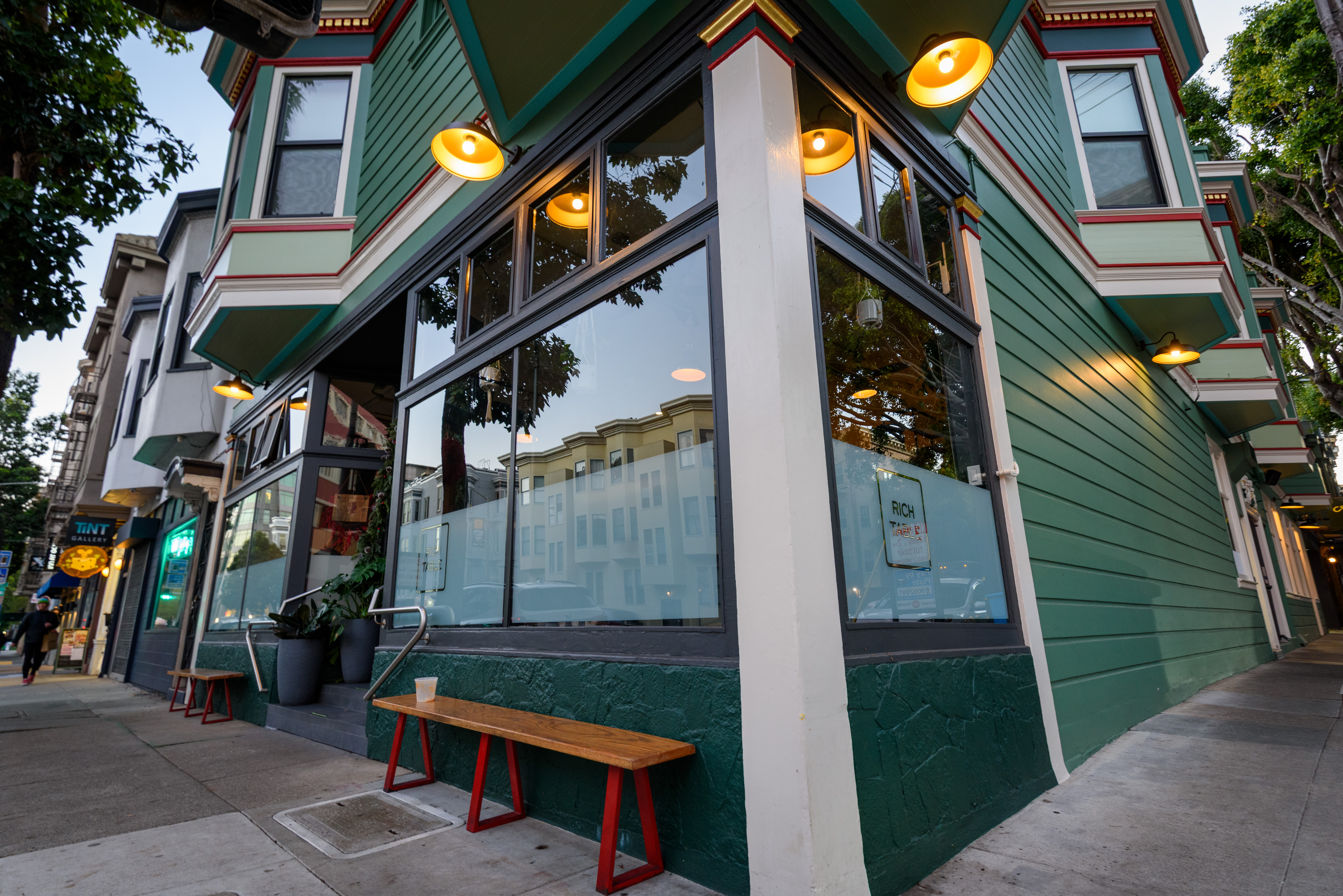
- The facade of Rich Table.
- Interactive map of Rich Table

Restaurant information
- Food type: American; Californian; New American
- Location: 199 Gough Street, San Francisco, California, 94102, United States
- Coordinates: 37°46′29.6″N 122°25′21.9″W

Rich Table is a restaurant in Hayes Valley, San Francisco, in the U.S. state of California. The restaurant serves American / Californian / New American cuisine. Rich Table formerly held a Michelin star from 2014 until 2021.

== See also ==
- List of Michelin-starred restaurants in California
- List of New American restaurants
