= Auberge du Soleil =

Restaurant and resort in California

Auberge du Soleil (meaning "Sun inn" in French) is a restaurant and resort in Rutherford, California, operated by Auberge Resorts. The restaurant and room interiors were created by California designer Michael Taylor. Their first chef was Masataka Kobayashi, who later founded Masa's in San Francisco. Auberge started as a restaurant in 1983, later adding the resort. It was ranked fifth in the top ten resorts in the US by Condé Nast Traveler in 2013 and has been awarded three Michelin keys.

== Restaurant ==
Auberge du Soleil
- Interactive map of Auberge du Soleil

Restaurant information
- Head chef: Robert Curry
- Food type: French-inspired Californian
- Rating: (Michelin Guide)
- Location: 180 Rutherford Hill Road, Rutherford, California, 94573, United States
- Reservations: Required

Auberge du Soleil is a Michelin-starred restaurant inside Auberge du Soleil Resort located in Rutherford, California, United States. The restaurant has been awarded a Michelin star every year since 2007, the first year Michelin Guide began reviewing San Francisco and Wine Country. The restaurant serves California cuisine. The restaurant features a 12,000-bottle cellar with more than 1,300-selection wine list. The dinner menu offers a three or four-course menu as well as a six-course tasting menu.

== Resort ==
Auberge du Soleil
- Interactive map of the Auberge du Soleil area

General information
- Status: Completed
- Type: Resort
- Location: 180 Rutherford Hill Road, Rutherford, California, United States

Design and construction
- Architect: Michael Taylor
- Awards: Michelin key

Other information
- Number of rooms: 50 rooms 2 maisons
- Number of restaurants: 1 (Auberge du Soleil)
- Number of bars: 1
- Facilities: Spa, swimming pool

The resort is built on a 33-acre olive grove on the slopes of Rutherford Hill in Napa Valley. The resort offers 50 guest rooms and suites along with two private maisons.

== Awards and accolades ==
- One Michelin star 2007-2026
- 3 Michelin keys
- Forbes Travel Guide, 5-star Awards 2026
- Wine Spectator, Best of Award of Excellence

== See also ==
- List of Michelin-starred restaurants in California
