= Cortez (restaurant) =

Defunct restaurant in San Francisco, California, U.S.

- Interactive map of Cortez

Restaurant information
- Location: 550 Geary Street, San Francisco, California, United States
- Coordinates: 37°47′13″N 122°24′45″W

Cortez was a restaurant in San Francisco. It received a Michelin star before closing in 2008.

== See also ==
- List of defunct restaurants of the United States
- List of Michelin-starred restaurants in California
