= Madera (restaurant) =

Restaurant in Menlo Park, California, U.S.

- Interactive map of Madera

Restaurant information
- Location: 2825 Sand Hill Road, Menlo Park, California, 94025, United States
- Coordinates: 37°25′11″N 122°12′42″W
- Website: maderasandhill.com

Madera is a restaurant in Menlo Park, California. It operates in the Rosewood Sand Hill hotel. It has received a Michelin star.

== See also ==
- List of Michelin-starred restaurants in California
