= Shunji (restaurant) =

Japanese restaurant in Santa Monica, California, U.S.

- Interactive map of Shunji

Restaurant information
- Established: 2012
- Head chef: Shunji Nakao
- Food type: Japanese
- Location: 3003 Ocean Park Boulevard, Santa Monica, California, 90405, United States
- Coordinates: 34°1′13″N 118°27′14″W
- Seating capacity: 7-seat counter

Shunji is a Japanese restaurant in Santa Monica, California. The menu features a pre-fixe Japanese omasake menu.

== History ==
Shunji was established in 2012 located in West Los Angeles. It received a Michelin star in 2019. In 2021, they moved to their current location in Santa Monica.

== Reception ==
Time Out Los Angeles awarded the restaurant 4 out of 5 stars.

In 2019, the Michelin Guide awarded Shunji one Michelin star.

== See also ==
- List of Japanese restaurants
- List of Michelin-starred restaurants in California
