= Plumed Horse =

Restaurant in Saratoga, California, U.S.

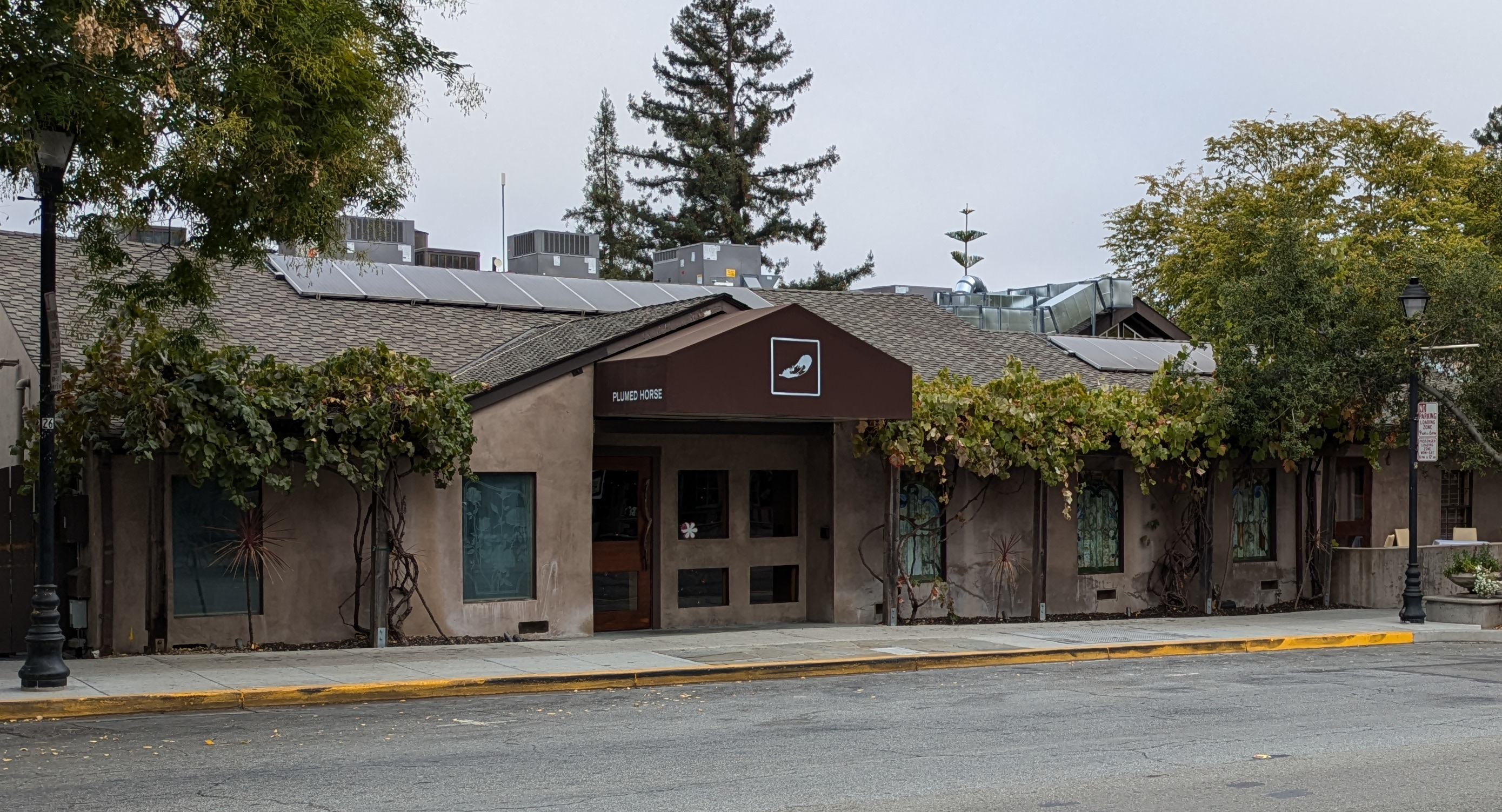
- Interactive map of Plumed Horse

Restaurant information
- Food type: New American
- Location: 14555 Big Basin Way, Saratoga, California, 95070, United States
- Coordinates: 37°15′23.6″N 122°2′6.7″W

Plumed Horse is a restaurant in Saratoga, California, United States. The restaurant serves New American cuisine and has received a Michelin star.

== See also ==
- List of Michelin-starred restaurants in California
- List of New American restaurants
