= Mourad (restaurant) =

Moroccan restaurant in San Francisco, California, U.S.

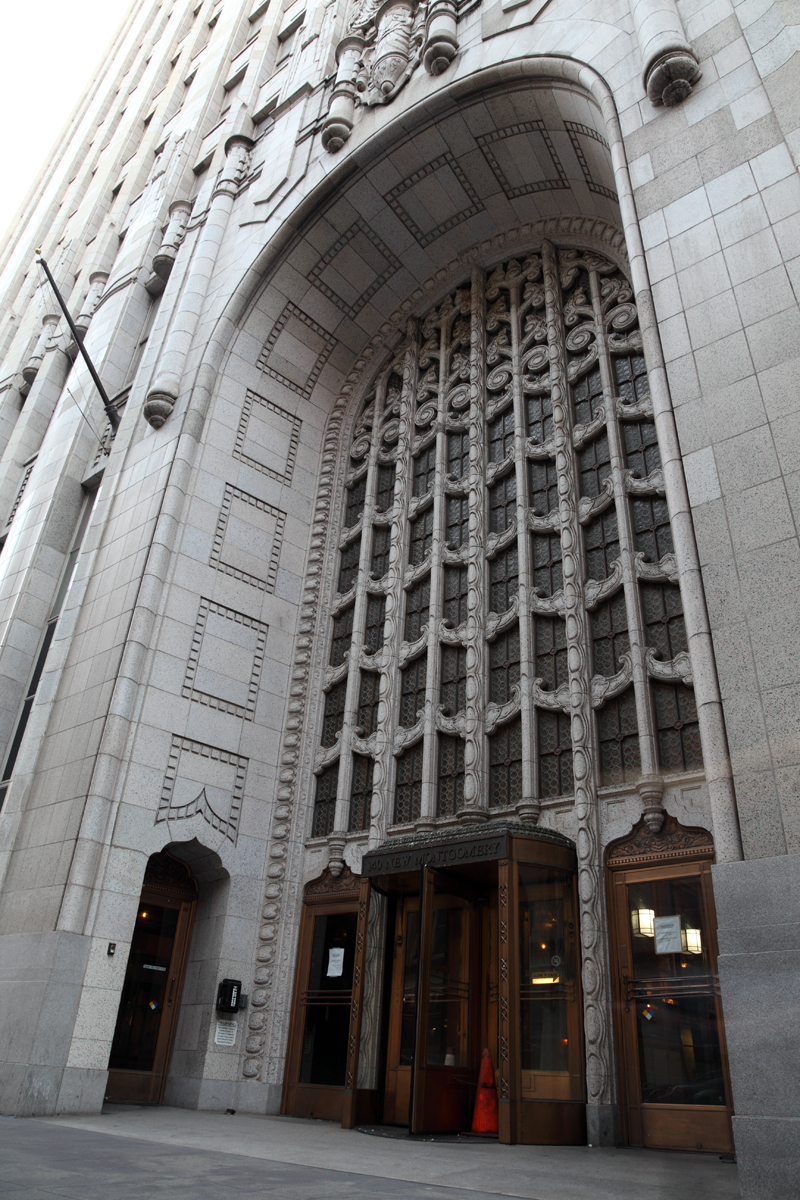
- Entrance
- Interactive map of Mourad

Restaurant information
- Closed: October 26, 2024
- Food type: Moroccan
- Location: 140 New Montgomery Street, San Francisco, California, 94105, United States
- Coordinates: 37°47′12.5″N 122°24′0″W

Mourad was a Moroccan restaurant in San Francisco, California, United States. It was founded by chef Mourad Lahlou in 2015, and is located in the former Pacific Telephone Building at 140 New Montgomery Street in the SoMA neighborhood. The restaurant closed in October 2024.

== See also ==
- List of Michelin-starred restaurants in California
