= Nico (restaurant) =

Defunct restaurant in San Francisco, California, U.S.

- Interactive map of Nico

Restaurant information
- Food type: French
- Location: 710 Montgomery Street, San Francisco, California, 94111, United States
- Coordinates: 37°47′45″N 122°24′12″W

Nico was a French bistro in San Francisco, California, United States. Owned by Andrea and Nicholas Delaroque, the restaurant received a Michelin star before closing. It opened in 2013. It closed in 2019 and was replaced with Maison Nico.

Nico's menu changed nightly. Michael Bauer of SFGate gave Nico a rating of 3.5 stars.

== See also ==
- List of defunct restaurants of the United States
- List of French restaurants
- List of Michelin-starred restaurants in California
