= Sushi Yoshizumi =

Japanese restaurant in San Mateo, California, U.S.

- Interactive map of Sushi Yoshizumi

Restaurant information
- Food type: Japanese
- Location: 325 East 4th Avenue, San Mateo, California, 94401, United States
- Coordinates: 37°33′55″N 122°19′16″W

Sushi Yoshizumi is a Japanese restaurant in San Mateo, California, United States. The restaurant has received a Michelin star.

== See also ==
- List of Japanese restaurants
- List of Michelin-starred restaurants in California
