= Wakuriya =

Japanese restaurant in San Mateo, California, U.S.

Coordinates: 37°31′17″N 122°20′12″W

- Interactive map of Wakuriya

Restaurant information
- Food type: Japanese
- Rating: (Michelin Guide)
- Location: 115 De Anza Boulevard, San Mateo, California, 94402, United States

Wakuriya is a Japanese restaurant in San Mateo, California. The restaurant is owned by Katsuhiro and Mayumi Yamasaki. It has received a Michelin star award.

== See also ==
- List of Japanese restaurants
- List of Michelin-starred restaurants in California
