= Sushi Shin =

Japanese restaurant in Redwood City, California, U.S.

- Interactive map of Sushi Shin

Restaurant information
- Food type: Japanese
- Location: 312 Arguello Street, Redwood City, California, United States
- Coordinates: 37.4866°N 122.232°W
- Website: sushishinredwoodcity.com

Sushi Shin is a Japanese restaurant in Redwood City, California, United States. It has received a Michelin star.

== See also ==
- List of Japanese restaurants
- List of Michelin-starred restaurants in California
