= Cut (restaurant) =

Restaurant in Los Angeles, California, U.S.

CUT

Restaurant information
- Established: 2006; 20 years ago
- Owner: Wolfgang Puck Dining Group
- Food type: Steakhouse
- Location: 9500 Wilshire Boulevard, Beverly Hills, California, 90212

CUT (sometimes referred to as CUT by Wolfgang Puck) is a high-end steakhouse restaurant chain with the original location in the Beverly Wilshire Hotel in Beverly Hills, California, U.S. founded by chef Wolfgang Puck.

Since its opening in 2006, they have added numerous locations including Las Vegas (2008), New York City (2016), Singapore (2010), and Washington, D.C (2019) and is operated by the Wolfgang Puck Dining Group.

== Awards and accolades ==
- 1 Michelin star by the Michelin Guide for California in 2019 and 2021

== See also ==
- List of Michelin-starred restaurants in California
