= Silvers Omakase =

Japanese restaurant in Santa Barbara, California, U.S.

- Interactive map of Silvers Omakase

Restaurant information
- Established: February 2024
- Head chef: Lennon Silvers Lee
- Food type: Japanese
- Rating: (Michelin Guide)
- Location: 224 Helena Avenue, Santa Barbara, California, 93101, United States
- Coordinates: 34°24′55″N 119°41′30″W
- Seating capacity: 10-seat counter
- Reservations: Required
- Website: silversomakase.com

Silvers Omakase is a Michelin-starred Japanese restaurant in Santa Barbara, California, United States.

== Overview ==
Located in the Funk Zone in downtown Santa Barbara, Silvers Omakase is a 2-hour dinner dinner that ranges from 13 to 20 courses which is 75% sushi and 25% plated courses.

== See also ==
- List of Japanese restaurants
- List of Michelin-starred restaurants in California
