= Sushi Zo =

Japanese restaurant

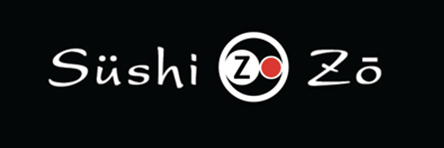

Restaurant information
- Food type: Japanese
- Location: Los Angeles; New York City, United States
- Other locations
- Website: sushizo.us

Sushi Zo is a Japanese restaurant with locations in Los Angeles and New York City, in the United States.

== See also ==
- List of Japanese restaurants
- List of Michelin-starred restaurants in California
- List of Michelin-starred restaurants in New York City
