= Selby's Restaurant =

Restaurant in North Fair Oaks, California, U.S.

Coordinates: 37°28′07″N 122°12′38″W

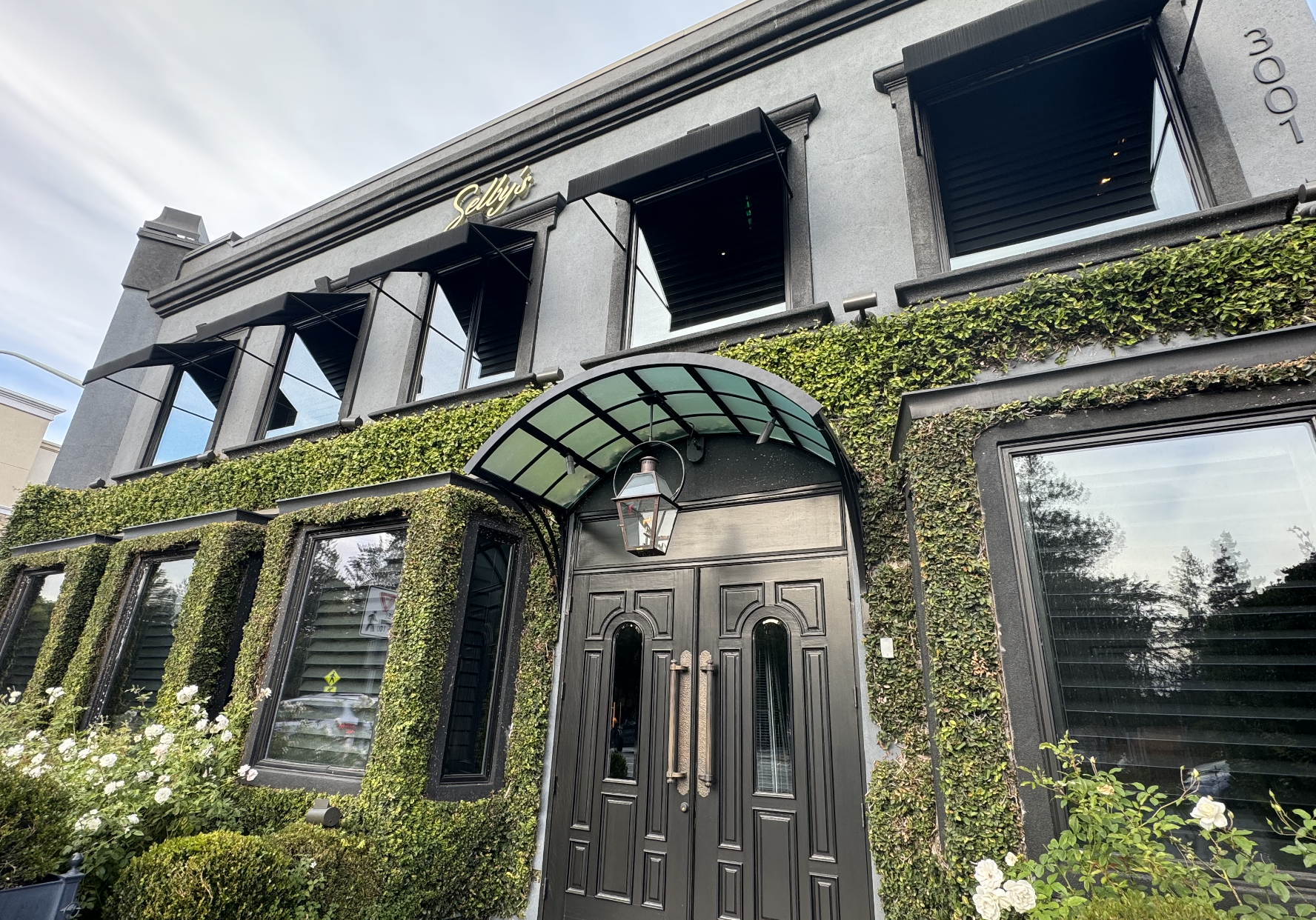
- Interactive map of Selby's Restaurant

Restaurant information
- Food type: New American
- Rating: (Michelin Guide)
- Location: 3001 El Camino Real, Redwood City, CA, 94061, United States
- Seating capacity: 70
- Website: https://www.selbysrestaurant.com/private-dining

Selby's is a New American restaurant in North Fair Oaks, California. Opened in 2019, it was listed in the Michelin Guide with one star in 2021.

== Background ==
Selby's Restaurant opened on July 23, 2019. It was begun by Tim Stannard of the Bacchus Management Group. The 10,000 square-foot building where Selby's now resides, used to be home to another restaurant, Chantilly's, that closed in 2017.

== Dining ==
Selby's menu is based on American cuisine. Reviewers have noted Selby's caviar appetizer, beef wellington and deluxe beef burger. The restaurant's wine list centers around wine from California, Italy, France and Spain.

== See also ==
- List of Michelin-starred restaurants in California
