= Sushi Inaba =

Japanese restaurant in Torrance, California, U.S.

- Interactive map of Sushi Inaba

Restaurant information
- Head chef: Yasuhiro Hirano
- Food type: Japanese
- Rating: (Michelin Guide)
- Location: 20918 Hawthorne Boulevard, Torrance, California, 90503, United States
- Coordinates: 33°50′23″N 118°21′11″W

Sushi Inaba is a Michelin-starred Japanese restaurant in Torrance, California, United States. Located inside I-naba Japanese restaurant, Sushi Inaba serves omakase-style sushi at a 6-seat counter.

== See also ==
- List of Japanese restaurants
- List of Michelin-starred restaurants in California
