= Nisei (restaurant) =

Japanese restaurant in San Francisco, California, U.S.

- Interactive map of Nisei

Restaurant information
- Head chef: David Yoshimura
- Food type: Japanese-American cuisine
- Rating: (Michelin Guide)
- Location: 2316 Polk Street, San Francisco, California, 94109, United States
- Coordinates: 37°47′53.5″N 122°25′19.5″W
- Website: restaurantnisei.com

Nisei by David Yoshimura is a restaurant in San Francisco, California, United States. It was awarded its first Michelin star in the 2022 Michelin Guide.

== History ==
The restaurant opened in August 2021. Six months after the restaurant opening, it earned a Michelin star. The chef-owner is David Yoshimura. Yoshimura also won the Michelin guide's Young Chef Award for California. Next door is Bar Iris, the sister cocktail bar to Nisei which serves high end Japanese influenced cocktails.

== Menu ==
At its inception, the menu at Nisei was based in washoku style Japanese cuisine, but later evolved into refined, modern Japanese American cuisine. The menu focuses on using only the best products from Northern California, sophisticated cooking methods, and intense Japanese flavors. It has 10-course tasting menu, but if counting on each item individually, it's more likely to 17 different tastes. Nisei is a personal reflection of chef Yoshimura's unique experience as a chef and Nisei (second-generation Japanese American).

== See also ==
- List of Japanese restaurants
- List of Michelin-starred restaurants in California
