= Jū-Ni =

Restaurant in San Francisco, California, U.S.

Coordinates: 37.7767°N 122.4389°W

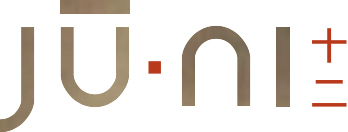
- Industry: Food & Beverage
- Founded: February 29, 2016
- Founder: Geoffrey Lee, Tan Truong
- Headquarters: San Francisco, California, U.S.
- Services: Japanese Omakase-style dining
- Website: www.junisf.com

Jū-Ni is an Omakase-style sushi restaurant located at 1335 Fulton Street in San Francisco, California founded by Geoffrey Lee and Tan Truong. It was Michelin-starred in 2017, and lost the star in 2022.

== History ==
The concept behind Jū-Ni came together in 2015 when Lee decided that he wanted to start his own restaurant. They used the existing Candybar space for their new restaurant. By November of 2015, Candybar closed to the public and construction for Jū-Ni began.

The restaurant opened on February 29, 2016. Since then, it has won several awards including the San Francisco Chronicle Rising Star Chef 2016, San Francisco Rising Star Chef, and One Michelin Star.

== Critical reception ==
According to the Michelin review, "A meal may begin with a tasting of seasonal vegetables—think tomatoes over edamame hummus—before proceeding to an array of nigiri, painstakingly sourced straight from Tokyo’s own Tsukiji fish market and delicately draped over well-seasoned pillows of rice." Restaurant critic Michael Bauer wrote in the San Francisco Chronicle that "Ju-ni is a fascinating lesson in the precision needed to raise a piece of fish, a pad of rice and a few seasonings to ethereal heights." The Zagat restaurant review website describes Jū-Ni as an "upscale omakase bistro serving a spendy set menu of chef’s choice sushi that’s updated regularly and features ingredients imported from Tokyo (plus a few drinks)." In SF Weekly, reviewer Peter Lawrence Kane wrote, "A fat pile of ikura (salmon roe) marinated in soy sauce, sake, and honey and slathered with shaved ankimo (monkfish liver, the foie gras of the sea) that's stored in a "super-freezer" to keep it chilled far below zero was by far the highlight of my night, made more so by the admonition to eat it right away, in one bite." Writing in Condé Nast Traveler, reviewer Jenna Scatena wrote, "The intimate, Eastern-inspired design can make even the most anxious diner feel zen, while the small (12-seat!) sushi bar makes for a cozy dining experience", and "Give over all your trust to the chef; you'll be thankful that you did."

== See also ==
- List of Michelin-starred restaurants in California
