= Phenakite (restaurant) =

Restaurant in Los Angeles, California, U.S.

- Interactive map of Phenakite

Restaurant information
- Established: 2020; 6 years ago
- Closed: 2022; 4 years ago
- Head chef: Minh Phan
- Food type: Contemporary Asian
- Rating: (Michelin Guide)
- Location: 1370 N. St. Andrews Place, Los Angeles, Los Angeles, California, 90028, United States
- Coordinates: 34.09641°N 118.31062°W

Phenakite was a Michelin Guide-starred restaurant in Los Angeles, California, United States, that was founded by Minh Phan in 2020. It closed in 2022 during the height of the COVID-19 pandemic. There were plans to return as PKite Studio in 2024. Instead, chef Phan decided to quit the restaurant business and work for a surplus-produce nonprofit.

== Reception ==
Phenakite was named '2021 Restaurant of the Year' by the Los Angeles Times and included on the newspaper's 2020 list of '101 Best Los Angeles Restaurants'. The business was awarded a Michelin star in 2021. In an October 2021 article, Variety reported that Phenakite had more than 20,000 people waiting to get reservations.

== See also ==
- List of defunct restaurants of the United States
- List of Michelin-starred restaurants in California
