= Commonwealth (restaurant) =

Defunct restaurant in San Francisco, California, U.S.

- Interactive map of Commonwealth

Restaurant information
- Established: 2010
- Closed: 2019
- Food type: California
- Location: 2224 Mission Street, San Francisco, California, 94110, United States
- Coordinates: 37°45′41″N 122°25′10″W

Commonwealth was a fine dining restaurant serving California cuisine in San Francisco's Mission District, in the U.S. state of California. The restaurant opened in 2010 and closed in 2019.

== See also ==
- List of defunct restaurants of the United States
- List of Michelin-starred restaurants in California
