= Hana re =

Japanese restaurant in Costa Mesa, California, U.S.

- Interactive map of Hana re

Restaurant information
- Established: 2015
- Head chef: Atsushi Yokoyama
- Food type: Japanese, omakase
- Location: 2930 Bristol Street, Costa Mesa, California, 92626, United States
- Coordinates: 33.67719°N 117.88533°W
- Seating capacity: 10-seat counter
- Reservations: Required
- Website: hanaresushi.com

Hana re is a Japanese restaurant in Costa Mesa, California, United States.

== Reviews ==
In 2016, Yokoyama was crowned chef of the year by the Orange County Register. The restaurant received a Michelin star from 2019 to 2023.

== See also ==
- List of Japanese restaurants
- List of Michelin-starred restaurants in California
