= Commis (restaurant) =

Restaurant in Oakland, California

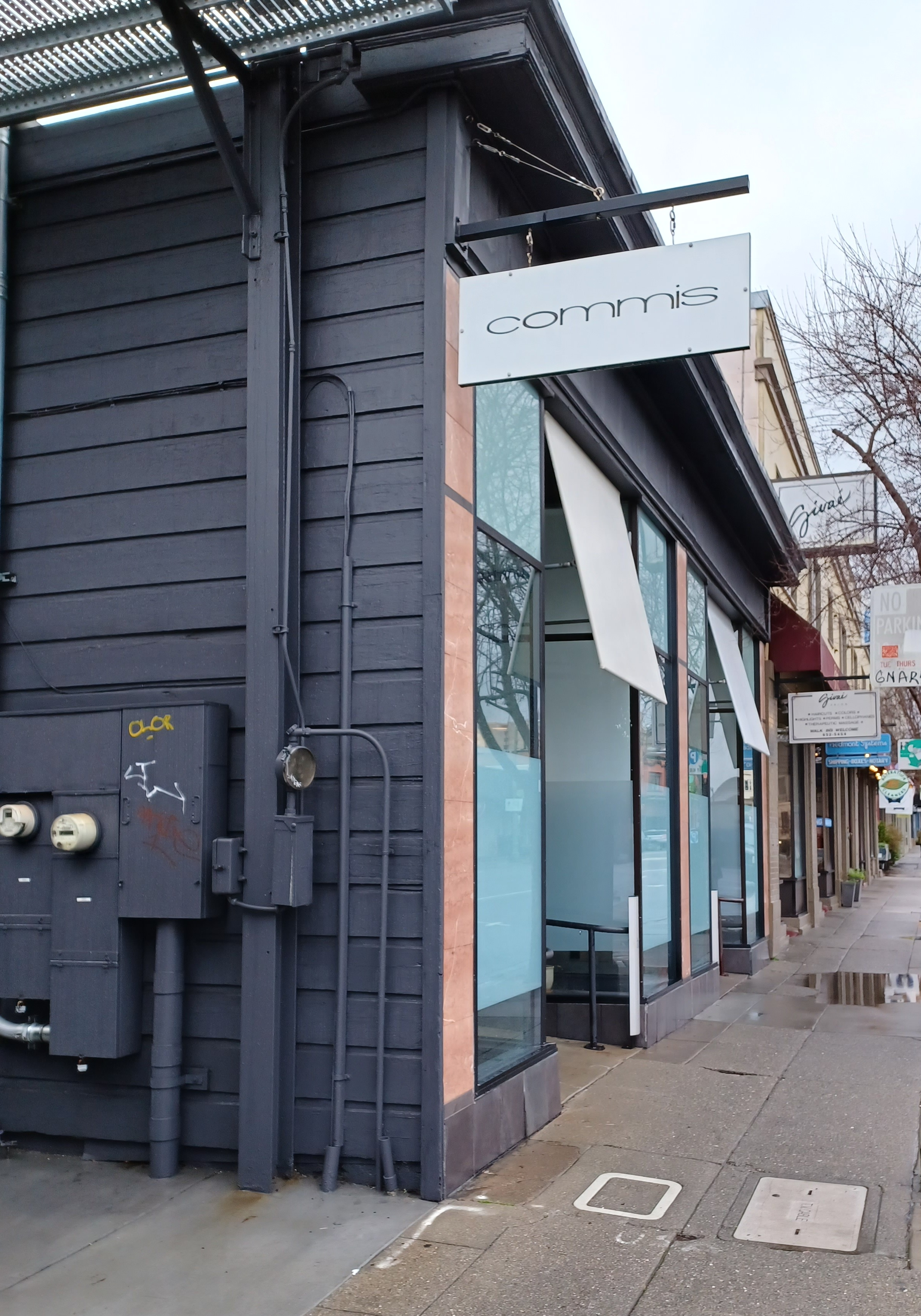
- The restaurant's exterior, 2023
- Interactive map of Commis

Restaurant information
- Owner: James Syhabout
- Head chef: James Syhabout
- Rating: Michelin Guide
- Location: 3859 Piedmont Ave., Oakland, California, 94611, United States
- Coordinates: 37°49′29″N 122°15′17.6″W
- Seating capacity: 31
- Website: commisrestaurant.com

Commis is a Michelin Guide-starred restaurant in Oakland, in the U.S. state of California.

Head chef and owner is James Syhabout. The dishes served reflect the background of head chef Syhabout, who has a Thai mother and Chinese father who introduced him to both styles of cooking.

== See also ==
- List of Michelin-starred restaurants in California
