= Le Comptoir =

Restaurant in Los Angeles, California, U.S.

Restaurant information
- Established: 2014; 12 years ago
- Head chef: Gary Menes
- Food type: Vegetarian
- Location: 3606 West Sixth Street, Los Angeles, California, 90020
- Seating capacity: 10-seat counter
- Website: lecomptoirla.com

Le Comptoir is a vegetarian restaurant located in Koreatown, Los Angeles, California inside Hotel Normandie and head by Michelin-starred chef Gary Menes.

== Menu ==
An eight-course seasonal, fully-vegetarian tasting menu of traditional French treated California produce, with optional protein add-ons such as truffles, lobster and pork belly.

== Accolades ==
- 2017 Los Angeles Times list of 101 Best Restaurants by Jonathan Gold
- 1 Michelin star in 2019 and 2021

== See also ==
- List of Michelin-starred restaurants in California
