= Press (restaurant) =

Restaurant in St. Helena, California, U.S.

- Interactive map of Press

Restaurant information
- Owner: Samantha Rudd
- Previous owner: Leslie Rudd
- Head chef: Philip Tessier
- Food type: Modern
- Rating: (Michelin Guide)
- Location: 587 St Helena Highway, St. Helena, California, 94574, United States
- Coordinates: 38.4891°N 122.4503°W
- Website: pressnapavalley.com

Press is a restaurant in St. Helena, California, United States.

== Awards and accolades ==
- 1 Michelin star

== See also ==
- List of Michelin-starred restaurants in California
