= All Spice =

Restaurant in San Mateo, California, U.S.

- Interactive map of All Spice

Restaurant information
- Established: March 2015
- Closed: March 12, 2018 (SF)
- Owners: Sachin Chopra; Shoshana Wolff
- Food type: Californian
- Location: 1602 South El Camino Real, San Mateo, California, 94402, United States
- Coordinates: 37°33′10.5″N 122°18′56.5″W
- Website: allspicerestaurant.com

All Spice is a restaurant in San Mateo, California, United States. The restaurant has received a Michelin star.

== History ==
All Spice was established in March 2015. Its San Francisco location closed on March 12, 2018, due to a lack of customers.

== See also ==
- List of Michelin-starred restaurants in California
