= The Kitchen (California restaurant) =

Michelin-starred farm-to-fork restaurant in Sacramento

- Interactive map of The Kitchen

Restaurant information
- Head chef: Kelly McCown (exec. chef)
- Rating: (2019–present), AAA Five Diamond Award (2011–2025)
- Location: 915 Broadway, Suite 100, Sacramento, Sacramento County, California, 95825, United States
- Coordinates: 38°35′21.28″N 121°24′50.75″W
- Website: thekitchenrestaurant.com

The Kitchen is a Michelin-starred farm-to-fork restaurant in Sacramento, California.

== History ==
The Kitchen was opened at Marconi Avenue in 1991 by chefs Randall Selland and Nancy Zimmer, both husband and wife, alongside Nancy's catering business. Randall and Nancy moved the restaurant and her catering business to 2225 Hurley Way in 1997. In 2001, Selland's Market Cafe was opened at 5340 H Street, and Nancy reduced her catering business from full service to only drop-offs and pickups from the cafe.

The Kitchen's executive chef is Kelly McCown, who has worked at the restaurant since the 1990s. Its menu has been seasonal. In 2003, Tuesday nights were reserved for only private dining, and it publicly operated from Wednesday to Saturday nights per week.

Besides The Kitchen and the East Sacramento location of Selland's Market Cafe, the Selland Family Restaurants group also operates another farm-to-fork restaurant Ella Dining Room and Bar, an Italian eatery OBO' Italian Table and Bar, and El Dorado Hills and Broadway (Sacramento) locations of Selland's Market Cafe. Members of the restaurant group and of other groups on August 31, 2019, opened a fried chicken restaurant Bawk, fully owned by Urban Roots Brewing & Smokehouse since its reopening on October 28, 2020.

Announced in April 2015, the site of 915 Broadway was the planned relocation of The Kitchen. The 1.9-acre (0.77 ha) property included the 15,000 sq ft (1,400 m^{2}) building and was bought for USD$2.6 million (equivalent to $3.5 million in 2025). The Broadway site after the January 2016 announcement eventually became the third location of Market Cafe, the chain that has had broader appeal, due to feedback from customers who wanted another Market Cafe location. Meanwhile, The Kitchen underwent renovations: "expanded wine cellar", "redone bathrooms", and increased space for dining rooms. The restaurant's bakery section was relocated to the Cafe's Broadway site. Its office, consolidated with the office of the Cafe's H Street site, was relocated to another site.

Amid the COVID-19 pandemic, The Kitchen was closed throughout most of the year 2020 until October 14.

== Reception ==
As of 2019, The Kitchen has received highest Zagat ratings and the AAA Five Diamond Award consecutively since 2011. OpenTable named it one of top 100 restaurants in the United States providing "best service" in 2012 and then "100 Best Restaurants" in the US for 2016. The Kitchen received its first Michelin star on June 3, 2019, becoming the first Michelin-starred restaurant in Sacramento. The USA Today in August 2019 ranked it thirtieth out of its top thirty restaurants in the US, reviewed by 24/7 Wall St.

== See also ==
- List of Michelin-starred restaurants in California
