= One Market =

Restaurant in San Francisco, California, U.S.

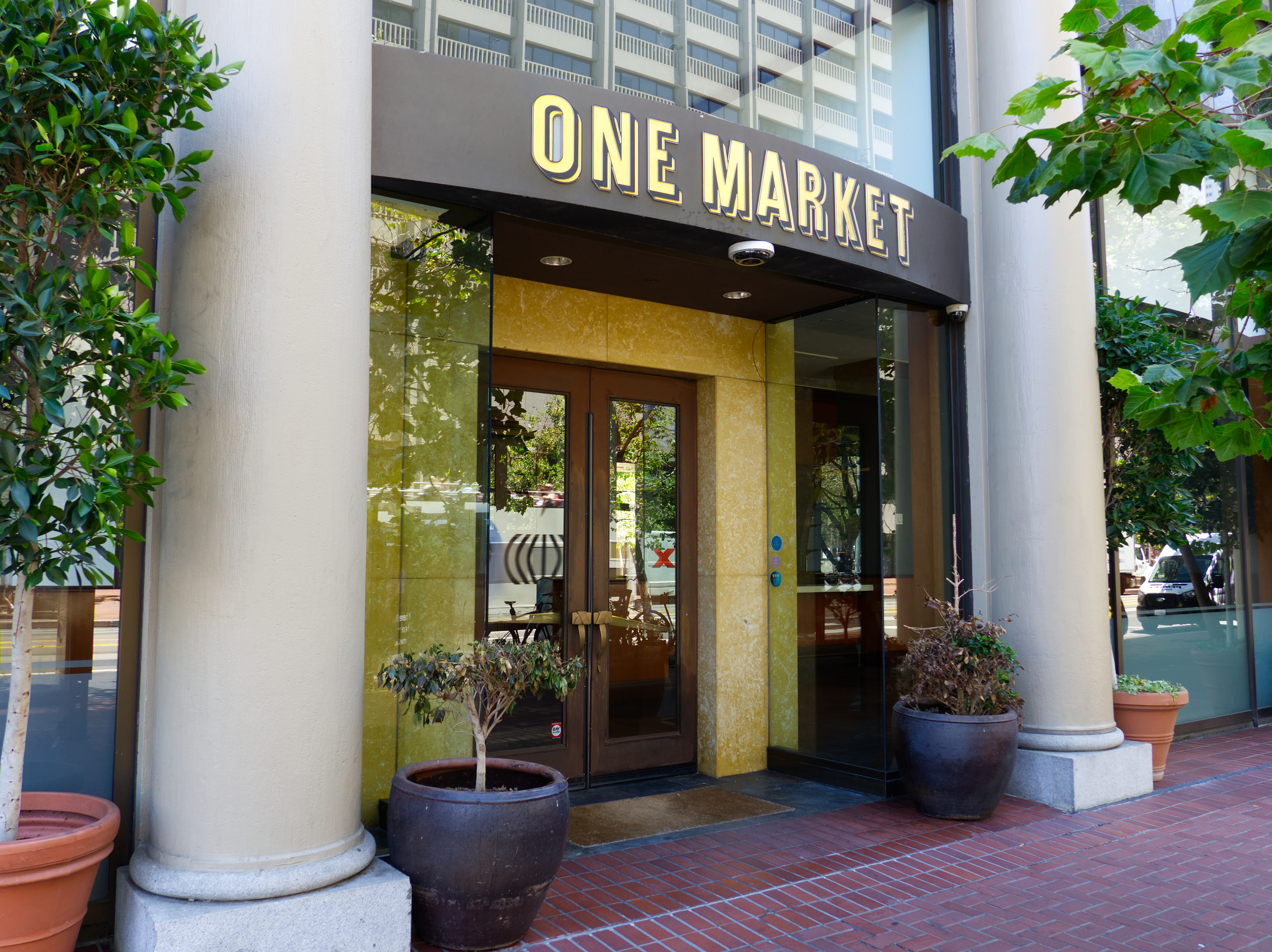
- One Market's entrance in July 2026, after the restaurant's closure
- Interactive map of One Market

Restaurant information
- Location: 1 Market Street, San Francisco, California, 94105, United States
- Coordinates: 37°47′39.5″N 122°23′41″W

One Market was a restaurant in San Francisco, California, United States. It closed permanently on June 11, 2025.

== Reception ==
One Market held a Michelin Star from 2008 to 2012. In 2018, Time Out San Francisco rated the restaurant three out of five stars.

== See also ==
- List of Michelin-starred restaurants in California
