= Kenzo (restaurant) =

Japanese restaurant in Napa, California, U.S.

- Interactive map of Kenzo

Restaurant information
- Food type: Japanese
- Location: 1339 Pearl Street, Napa, California, 94559, United States
- Coordinates: 38°17′56″N 122°17′22″W

Kenzo is a Japanese restaurant in Napa, California. The restaurant opened in 2016 and has received a Michelin star.

== See also ==
- List of Japanese restaurants
- List of Michelin-starred restaurants in California
