= Chez Noir =

Restaurant in Carmel-by-the-Sea, California, U.S.

- Interactive map of Chez Noir

Restaurant information
- Head chef: Jonny Black
- Rating: (Michelin Guide)
- Location: 5th Avenue between San Carlos & Dolores Streets, Carmel-by-the-Sea, California, 93921, United States
- Coordinates: 36°33′25″N 121°55′20″W
- Website: www.cheznoircarmel.com

Chez Noir is a restaurant in Carmel-by-the-Sea, California, in the U.S. state of California. It has received a Michelin star, and was a semifinalist in the Best New Restaurant category of the James Beard Foundation Awards in 2024.

== See also ==
- List of Michelin-starred restaurants in California
