= Camphor (restaurant) =

Restaurant in Los Angeles, California, U.S.

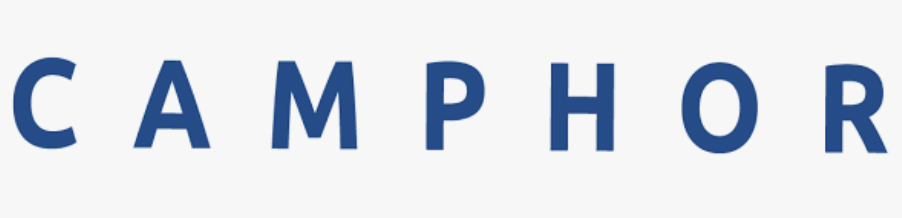
- Interactive map of Camphor

Restaurant information
- Established: April 23, 2022
- Owners: Sarah Lam; Cyrus Batchan
- Head chef: Max Boonthanakit
- Food type: French contemporary
- Rating: (Michelin Guide)
- Location: 923 E 3rd St #109, Los Angeles, Los Angeles, California, 90013, United States
- Coordinates: 34°2′47.9″N 118°14′3.3″W
- Reservations: Encouraged
- Website: camphor.la

Camphor is a Michelin-starred restaurant in the Arts District neighborhood of Los Angeles, California, United States. According to Variety, the business "marries French technique with South Asian influences".

== Background ==
Camphor was conceptualized by No.8 Hospitality group founded by Cyrus Batchan. Located in the Arts District.

The restaurant's cuisine was created by Chef Max Boonthanakit, previously served as Executive Pastry Chef at the Michelin-starred restaurant Blue in Bangkok and had trained under Alain Ducasse.

== See also ==
- List of Michelin-starred restaurants in California
