= Soichi (restaurant) =

Restaurant in San Diego, California, U.S.

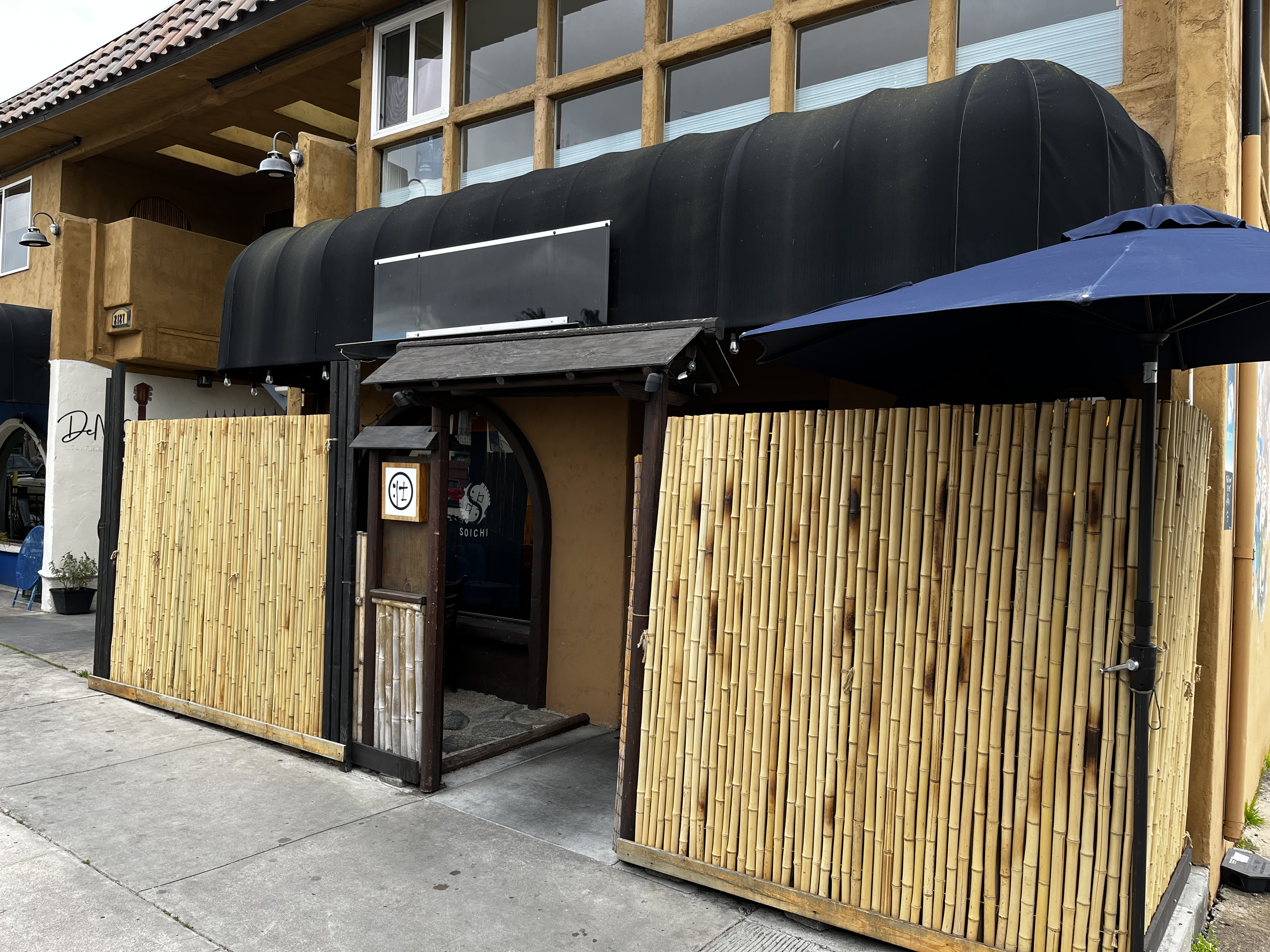
- The restaurant's exterior, 2023
- Interactive map of Soichi

Restaurant information
- Head chef: Soichi Kadoya
- Food type: Japanese
- Rating: (Michelin Guide)
- Location: 2121 Adams Ave., San Diego, California, 92116, United States
- Coordinates: 32°45′45.5″N 117°8′30.5″W
- Website: https://www.soichisushi.com/

Soichi is a Michelin-starred Japanese restaurant in the University Heights neighborhood of San Diego, California, United States.

== Description ==
Soichi serves Japanese cuisine.

== Reception ==
Soichi earned one Michelin star in 2022.

== See also ==
- List of Japanese restaurants
- List of Michelin-starred restaurants in California
