= Rustic Canyon (restaurant) =

Restaurant in Santa Monica, California, U.S.

- Interactive map of Rustic Canyon

Restaurant information
- Established: December 2006
- Owner: Josh Loeb
- Head chef: Elijah Deleon
- Food type: American; Californian
- Location: 1119 Wilshire Boulevard, Santa Monica, California, 90401, United States
- Coordinates: 34°1′30.3″N 118°29′28.7″W
- Website: rusticcanyonrestaurant.com

Rustic Canyon is a restaurant in Santa Monica, California. The restaurant serves American / Californian cuisine and has received a Michelin star.

== Reviews and accolades ==
- 1 Michelin star in 2019 and 2021
- Named to Los Angeles Times 101 Best Restaurants in 2021
- Named to Los Angeles Times 101 Best Restaurants in 2024

== See also ==
- List of Michelin-starred restaurants in California
