= Spruce (restaurant) =

Restaurant in San Francisco, California, U.S.

- Interactive map of Spruce

Restaurant information
- Location: 3640 Sacramento Street, San Francisco, California, United States
- Coordinates: 37.7876°N 122.4527°W

Spruce is a restaurant in the Presidio Heights neighborhood of San Francisco, California, United States. It serves California / American cuisine. The restaurant has received a Michelin star.

== See also ==
- List of Michelin-starred restaurants in California
