= Ame (restaurant) =

Defunct restaurant in San Francisco, California, U.S.

- Interactive map of Ame

Restaurant information
- Location: 689 Mission Street, San Francisco, California, 94105, United States
- Coordinates: 37°47′11″N 122°24′6″W

Ame was a restaurant in San Francisco, California. The restaurant had received a Michelin star, before closing in 2016.

== See also ==
- List of defunct restaurants of the United States
- List of Michelin-starred restaurants in California
