= Sona (restaurant) =

Defunct restaurant in West Hollywood, California, U.S.

Coordinates: 34.0787°N 118.3768°W

Sona was a Michelin-starred restaurant in West Hollywood, California.

== See also ==
- List of Michelin-starred restaurants in California
