= Rebel Omakase =

Restaurant in Laguna Beach, California, U.S.

Restaurant information
- Established: 2021; 5 years ago
- Owner: Jordan Nakasone
- Head chef: Jordan Nakasone
- Food type: Japanese
- Dress code: Jacket preferred
- Rating: (Michelin Guide)
- Location: 361 Forest Ave., Laguna Beach, California, 92651
- Seating capacity: 10-seat L-shaped counter
- Reservations: Required
- Website: omakaserebel.com

Rebel Omakase (stylized as R|O-Rebel Omakase) is a Japanese restaurant located in Laguna Beach, California, U.S.. It is the first restaurant in Laguna Beach to receive a Michelin star.

== Menu ==
Rebel Omakase only offers an omakase menu offering a lunch and dinner menu.

== Awards and accolades ==
- 1 Michelin star from the Michelin Guide 2024 to present

== See also ==
- List of Japanese restaurants
- List of Michelin-starred restaurants in California
