= Sun Moon Studio =

Restaurant in Oakland, California, U.S.

- Interactive map of Sun Moon Studio

Restaurant information
- Established: 2024
- Owners: Sarah Cooper, Alan Hsu
- Head chef: Alan Hsu
- Pastry chef: Sarah Cooper
- Food type: California cuisine
- Rating: 1 Michelin star
- Location: 1940 Union St. Ste. 21, Oakland, California, 94607, United States
- Coordinates: 37°48′53″N 122°17′09″W
- Seating capacity: 12
- Reservations: required
- Website: www.sunmoonstudio.com

Sun Moon Studio is a Michelin-starred restaurant in Oakland, California, United States. Owned by co-chefs Sarah Cooper and Alan Hsu, it opened in 2024.

== History ==
Sarah Cooper and Alan Hsu opened Sun Moon Studios in summer 2024. Its name reflects contrasts including their opposed schedules when they met while working at Blue Hill at Stone Barns in New York, as well as their sharing the building with a variety of craftspeople and artists. After moving together to California, they had originally planned to open a restaurant and inn on a farm in the Pacific Northwest, but the purchase fell through.

The restaurant was awarded a Michelin star in June 2025.

== Restaurant ==
Sun Moon Studio is in West Oakland, on a block dominated by industry. It has a capacity of 12 seated at 4 tables. The restaurant serves a 13-course tasting menu four nights a week, Thursday through Sunday, increased from two at opening; the cuisine is Californian, described by Cooper and Hsu as "farmer and producer-driven", with dinner ending with fresh fruit.

Cooper and Hsu work alone in the kitchen, with Hsu being baker and patissier as well as co-chef. They also grow their own salad greens, grind their own bread flour, use gaiwans made by Cooper to serve a tofu dish, and initially washed their own linens and took bookings personally via e-mail. The restaurant opened with one employee, Übi Solorio, with whom they worked at Pomet restaurant in Oakland, who was responsible for front of house and beverages; as of August 2025 Michael Stephenes was also front of house staff.

== Reception ==
The chief restaurant critic of the San Francisco Chronicle, McKenzie Chung Fegan, named Sun Moon Studio as the best new restaurant in the Bay Area in 2024. The Michelin Guide describes the restaurant's style as "pared down and technically precise, letting products shine while adding a spark of personality."

Sun Moon Studio was included in The New York Times's 2025 list of the nation's 50 best restaurants and in Bon Appétit's 2025 list of the nation's 20 best new restaurants; a reviewer for The New York Times named it her favorite restaurant of the year, calling the dining experience there "joyous", and the reviewer for Bon Appétit wrote that Cooper and Hsu's approach made the restaurant feel like a "collaborative culinary experiment" to "[f]ind the most passionate food people in the Bay Area [and] celebrate their work."

== See also ==
- List of Michelin-starred restaurants in California
