= Lielle =

Restaurant in Los Angeles, California, U.S.

- Interactive map of Lielle

Restaurant information
- Head chef: Marcus Jernmark
- Food type: California cuisine
- Rating: (Michelin Guide)
- Location: 9575 West Pico Boulevard, Los Angeles, California, United States
- Coordinates: 34.0554°N 118.3976°W
- Website: lielle.la

Lielle is a Michelin-starred restaurant in Los Angeles, California, United States.

== See also ==
- List of Michelin-starred restaurants in California
