= Saddle Peak Lodge =

Restaurant in Calabasas, California, U.S.

- Interactive map of Saddle Peak Lodge

Restaurant information
- Food type: American; Californian
- Location: 419 Cold Canyon Road, Calabasas, California, 91302, United States
- Coordinates: 34°4′41.5″N 118°41′35.5″W
- Website: saddlepeaklodge.com

Saddle Peak Lodge is a restaurant in Calabasas, California. The restaurant serves American / Californian cuisine and has received a Michelin star. Frommer's has rated the restaurant two out of three stars.

== See also ==
- List of Michelin-starred restaurants in California
