= Manzke =

Restaurant in Los Angeles, California, U.S.

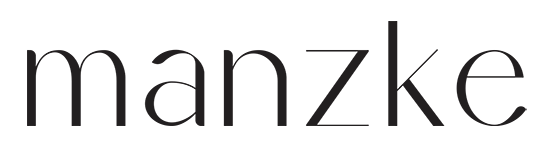
- Interactive map of Manzke

Restaurant information
- Established: March 2022
- Closed: March 2024
- Head chef: Walter Manzke
- Pastry chef: Margarita Manzke
- Rating: (Michelin Guide)
- Location: 9575 W Pico Boulevard, Los Angeles, California, 90035, United States
- Coordinates: 34°3′19.5″N 118°23′51.5″W
- Website: manzkerestaurant.com

Manzke was a Michelin-starred restaurant in Los Angeles, California, United States. It opened in March 2022 and was awarded its Michelin star later that year. According to the Michelin Guide, the restaurant offered a "ten-course tasting menu boasting a contemporary style that blends French techniques with Californian influences and Asian notes". The Infatuation says Manzke served American and French cuisine.

In February 2024, the Manzkes announced that they would close the restaurant on March 2 of that year, due to increasing costs and other financial pressures.

== See also ==
- List of defunct restaurants of the United States
- List of Michelin-starred restaurants in California
