= La Toque =

Restaurant in Napa, California, U.S.

- Interactive map of La Toque

Restaurant information
- Established: 2008
- Chef: Ken Frank
- Location: 1314 McKinstry Street, Napa, California, 94559, United States
- Coordinates: 38°18′15″N 122°17′2″W

La Toque is a restaurant in Napa, California owned and operated by Chef Ken Frank. Since its relocation to Napa Valley, La Toque has received critical acclaim, including a Michelin star each year from 2008 to 2021. Fodor's has described the food as French-inspired modern American.

== History ==
La Toque was established in 1979 by chef Ken Frank on the Sunset Strip in Los Angeles, when he was 23 years old.

The restaurant gained attention for its use of fresh, seasonal ingredients and its blend of French culinary techniques with Californian influences. After operating in Los Angeles for nearly two decades, Frank relocated the restaurant to Rutherford in Napa Valley in 1998. In 2008, the restaurant moved to its current location within The Westin Verasa Napa hotel in downtown Napa.

== Cuisine ==
The menu at La Toque integrates classic French cooking techniques with ingredients sourced from the Napa Valley and surrounding regions. The restaurant emphasizes on locally sourced products, focusing on seasonal availability to shape its offerings. Known for its food and wine pairings, La Toque provides wine list with over 2,300 selections.

== Design ==
The dining room includes an open kitchen, allowing diners to view the culinary process. The space now features a permanent translucent roof on the Terrace, installed in July 2023.

The Terrace also includes a fireplace and seating. Tables are equipped with floral arrangements, and crystal stemware.

== Reception ==
La Toque has received critical acclaim for its fusion of French and Californian culinary traditions. The restaurant has been celebrated for its refined dishes and use of seasonal ingredients.

Restaurant's wine program has been recognized by Wine Spectator for its curated wine list, the restaurant has been commended for its food and wine pairings.

A 1994 LA Times article, titled Last Impressions: A Final Tip of the Hat to La Toque, highlighted Frank’s impact on the Los Angeles culinary scene. Similarly, a piece by Colman Andrews in The New York Times praised Frank for his approach to French cuisine and his ability to adapt to the evolving tastes of his clientele.

== Awards ==
- The Grand Award from Wine Spectator, 2014.

== See also ==
- List of Michelin-starred restaurants in California
- List of New American restaurants
