= Ubuntu (restaurant) =

- Interactive map of Ubuntu

Restaurant information
- Established: 2007
- Closed: 2012
- Location: 1140 Main Street, Napa, California, 94559, United States
- Coordinates: 38°18′1.5″N 122°17′10.7″W

Ubuntu was a vegetarian restaurant in Napa Valley, California which also operated a yoga studio. It opened in 2007, and closed in 2012. The New York Times listed it as one of the ten best new American restaurants.

== See also ==
- List of Michelin-starred restaurants in California
