= Madcap (restaurant) =

Restaurant in San Anselmo, California, U.S.

- Interactive map of Madcap

Restaurant information
- Established: 2017
- Owner: Ron Siegel
- Head chef: Ron Siegel
- Food type: Asian
- Rating: (Michelin Guide)
- Location: 198 Sir Francis Drake Boulevard, San Anselmo, Marin, California, 94960, United States
- Coordinates: 37°58′29″N 122°33′42″W
- Seating capacity: 45
- Website: madcapmarin.com

Madcap is a contemporary Asian restaurant in San Anselmo, California. Opened in 2017 by Ron Siegel, the restaurant has received a Michelin star.

== Description ==
The 45-seat restaurant serves a prix fixe menu. Dishes include a rabbit tortelloni, tuna tartare with sesame seeds and ginger, charred octopus, a pot de crème with ice cream, and a salad made of summer melon and cucumber.

== History ==
Madcap opened in 2017 in a space previously occupied by the Lincoln Park Wine Bar.

== Reception ==
Madcap has received one Michelin star, denoting "high-quality cooking" that is "worth a stop". The Michelin Guide described it as an "upscale yet approachable" restaurant.

== See also ==
- List of Michelin-starred restaurants in California
