= Barndiva =

Restaurant in Healdsburg, California, U.S.

- Interactive map of Barndiva

Restaurant information
- Food type: American; Californian
- Location: 231 Center Street, Healdsburg, California, 95448
- Coordinates: 38°36′34.7″N 122°52′9.7″W

Barndiva is a restaurant in Healdsburg, California. The restaurant serves American / Californian cuisine and has received a Michelin star.

== See also ==
- List of Michelin-starred restaurants in California
