= Corridor 109 =

Restaurant in Los Angeles, California, U.S.

- Interactive map of Corridor 109

Restaurant information
- Head chef: Brian Baik
- Location: 641 North Western Avenue, Suite A, Los Angeles, California, 90004, United States
- Coordinates: 34.083°N 118.3096°W
- Seating capacity: 11-seat counter
- Website: corridor109.com

Corridor 109 is a Michelin-starred restaurant in Los Angeles, California, United States.

== See also ==
- List of Michelin-starred restaurants in California
