= Applewood Inn =

Defunct restaurant in Guerneville, California, U.S.

- Interactive map of Applewood Inn

Restaurant information
- Location: 13555 Highway 116, Guerneville, California, United States
- Coordinates: 38°29′58″N 122°59′20″W

The Applewood Inn was a restaurant in Guerneville, California, United States. It had received a Michelin star.

== See also ==
- List of Michelin-starred restaurants in California
