= Aster (restaurant) =

Defunct restaurant in San Francisco, California, U.S.

- Interactive map of Aster

Restaurant information
- Established: 2015
- Closed: March 30, 2019
- Food type: American
- Location: 1001 Guerrero Street, San Francisco, California, 94110, United States
- Coordinates: 37°45′18″N 122°25′23″W

Aster was a Michelin-starred restaurant in San Francisco, California. It served American cuisine. It opened in 2015 and closed on March 30, 2019.

== See also ==
- List of defunct restaurants of the United States
- List of Michelin-starred restaurants in California
