= Uka (restaurant) =

Japanese restaurant in Los Angeles, California, U.S.

- Interactive map of Uka

Restaurant information
- Established: 2023
- Closed: December 31, 2025
- Head chef: Yoshitaka Mitsue
- Food type: Japanese
- Rating: (Michelin Guide)
- Location: Ovation Hollywood 6801 Hollywood Boulevard, Level 5, Los Angeles, California, 90028, United States
- Coordinates: 34.1016°N 118.3392°W

Uka was a Michelin-starred Japanese restaurant in Los Angeles, California, United States. It received its first Michelin star in 2024.

The last day of service was December 31, 2025. UKA announced on its website they will move to a new location which has yet to be determined.

== See also ==
- List of defunct restaurants of the United States
- List of Japanese restaurants
- List of Michelin-starred restaurants in California
