= Sushi Tadokoro =

Restaurant in San Diego, California, U.S.

- Interactive map of Sushi Tadokoro

Restaurant information
- Established: 2012
- Owner: Takeaki Tadokoro
- Head chef: Takeaki Tadokoro
- Chef: Tatsuro Tsuchiya
- Location: 2244 San Diego Ave., San Diego, California, 92110, United States
- Coordinates: 32°44′54.2″N 117°11′29″W
- Seating capacity: 10-seat counter
- Reservations: Recommended
- Website: sushitadokoro.com

Sushi Tadokoro is a Japanese restaurant in San Diego, California.

== See also ==
- List of Japanese restaurants
- List of Michelin-starred restaurants in California
