= The Shota =

Japanese restaurant in San Francisco, California, U.S.

- Interactive map of The Shota

Restaurant information
- Closed: March 2025
- Owner: Ingi “Shota” Son
- Head chef: Ingi “Shota” Son
- Food type: Japanese
- Location: 115 Sansome Street, San Francisco, California, 94104, United States
- Coordinates: 37°47′29″N 122°24′04″W

The Shota was a Japanese restaurant in San Francisco, California. The restaurant has received a Michelin star, but lost it after temporarily closing in March 2025. As of July 2026, The Shota is still closed.

== See also ==
- List of Japanese restaurants
- List of Michelin-starred restaurants in California
