= Pasta Bar =

Restaurant in Los Angeles, California, U.S.

Restaurant information
- Established: 2021; 5 years ago
- Owners: Phillip and Margarita Lee
- Food type: Italian
- Rating: (Michelin Guide)
- Location: 16101 Ventura Blvd., Encino, California, 91436

Pasta Bar (stylized as Pasta|Bar) is a Michelin-starred Italian restaurant in Encino, California, U.S.

The restaurant serves a 12-course tasting menu.

== Awards and accolades ==
- 1 Michelin star by the Michelin Guide for California

== See also ==
- List of Michelin-starred restaurants in California
