= Kiln (restaurant) =

Restaurant in San Francisco, California, U.S.

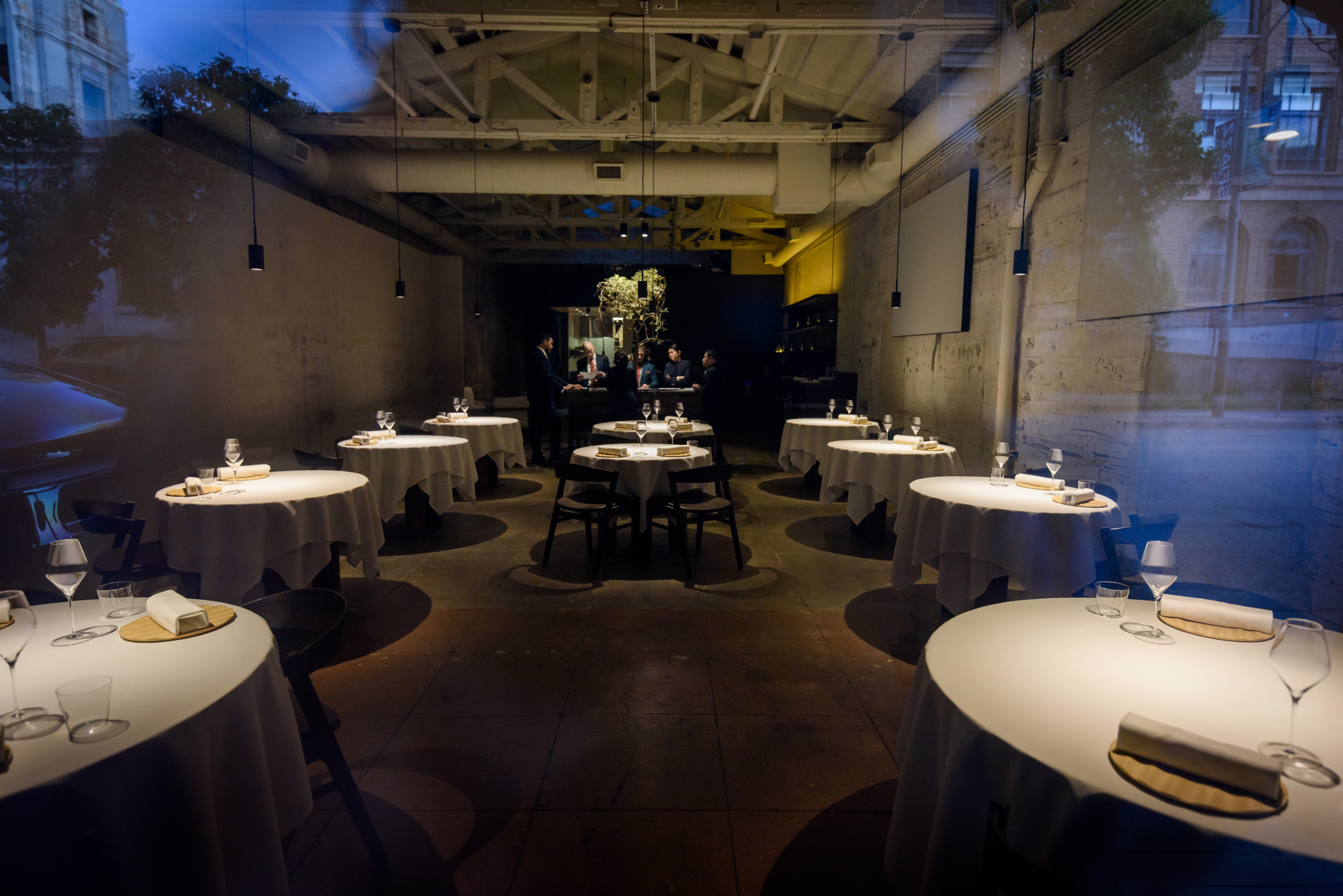
- A view through the window of Kiln.
- Interactive map of Kiln

Restaurant information
- Established: May 16, 2023
- Owners: John Wesley, Julianna Yang
- Manager: Julianna Yang
- Chef: John Wesley
- Food type: Contemporary fusion
- Rating: 2 Michelin stars
- Location: 149 Fell Street, San Francisco, California, 94102, United States
- Coordinates: 37°46′34″N 122°25′14″W
- Seating capacity: 34
- Website: kilnsf.com

Kiln is a fine dining restaurant in San Francisco, California, opened in 2023. It has two Michelin stars.

== Restaurant ==
Kiln is co-owned by chef John Wesley and general manager Julianna Yang, previously chef de cuisine and general manager at Sons & Daughters. It serves a tasting menu that blends French, Japanese, and Scandinavian techniques (Wesley previously cooked at restaurants including the New York City Scandinavian restaurant Aska) and emphasizes curing, drying, fermentation, and pickling. The Michelin Guide describes the food at Kiln as "lean[ing] Nordic". Wesley stated that he had been planning his first solo venture for a decade and chose the name "Kiln" to reflect the transformation both of the food and of the diner.

The restaurant is located in Hayes Valley in San Francisco, in a former garage with exposed concrete walls and a 30-foot ceiling. An olive tree from Sonoma County grows out of a custom serving station by furniture builders Oxford Design. Capacity is 34, at ten tables and the bar. Kiln retains the high-end sound system installed by the previous restaurant in the space, Cala. One reviewer noted that the minimalist decor contrasted with the loud rap and punk rock playing during dinner.

== History ==
Kiln opened on May 16, 2023.

In January 2024, Kiln was a semifinalist in the Best New Restaurant category of the James Beard Foundation Awards. It was awarded a Michelin star in August 2024 and a second in 2025. Wesley was also named Michelin Guide California's Young Chef of the Year in August 2024.

== See also ==
- List of Michelin-starred restaurants in California
