= Valle (restaurant) =

Mexican restaurant in Oceanside, California, U.S.

- Interactive map of Valle

Restaurant information
- Head chef: Roberto Alcocer
- Food type: Mexican
- Location: 222 N Pacific Street, Oceanside, California, 92054, United States
- Coordinates: 33°11′40.7″N 117°23′0.3″W
- Website: valleoceanside.com

Valle is a Mexican restaurant in Oceanside, California, United States.

== See also ==
- List of Mexican restaurants
- List of Michelin-starred restaurants in California
