= Marlena (restaurant) =

Restaurant in San Francisco, California, U.S.

- Interactive map of Marlena

Restaurant information
- Closed: 2023
- Food type: American
- Location: 300 Precita Avenue, San Francisco, California, 94110, United States
- Coordinates: 37°44′48″N 122°24′48″W

Marlena was a restaurant serving American cuisine in Bernal Heights, San Francisco, California. The restaurant opened in 2020.

The restaurant closed suddenly in 2023.

== See also ==
- List of defunct restaurants of the United States
- List of Michelin-starred restaurants in California
