= Six Test Kitchen =

Restaurant in Paso Robles, California, U.S.

- Interactive map of Six Test Kitchen

Restaurant information
- Chef: Ricky Odbert
- Location: 3075 Blue Rock Road, Paso Robles, California, United States
- Coordinates: 35°34′32″N 120°41′24″W
- Website: sixtestkitchen.com

Six Test Kitchen is a Michelin-starred restaurant in Paso Robles, California, United States. It has an open kitchen and a seating capacity of twelve people. Ricky Odbert is the chef.

== See also ==
- List of Michelin-starred restaurants in California
