= Hashiri =

Japanese restaurant in San Francisco, California, U.S.

- Interactive map of Hashiri

Restaurant information
- Food type: Japanese
- Location: 4 Mint Plaza, San Francisco, California, 94103, United States
- Coordinates: 37°46′59″N 122°24′28″W

Hashiri (also known as Sushi Hashiri) is a fine dining, Japanese restaurant in San Francisco, California, United States.

== See also ==
- List of Japanese restaurants
- List of Michelin-starred restaurants in California
