= Octavia (restaurant) =

Restaurant in San Francisco, California, U.S.

- Interactive map of Octavia

Restaurant information
- Location: 1701 Octavia Street, San Francisco, California, 94109, United States
- Coordinates: 37°47′16.7″N 122°25′37.5″W

Octavia is a restaurant in San Francisco, California, United States. The restaurant serves Californian / American and Italian cuisine, and has received a Michelin star.

== See also ==
- List of Michelin-starred restaurants in California
