= Trois Mec =

- Interactive map of Trois Mec

Restaurant information
- Established: April 2013
- Closed: 2020
- Previous owners: Ludo Lefebvre, Vinny Dotolo and Jon Shook
- Food type: French cuisine
- Rating: (Michelin Guide)
- Location: 716 N. Highland Avenue, Los Angeles, California
- Coordinates: 34°5′9.64″N 118°19′49.4″W
- Seating capacity: 24

Trois Mec (“three guys”) was a 24-seat Michelin-starred French restaurant in Los Angeles. Ludo Lefebvre, Vinny Dotolo and Jon Shook opened the restaurant in 2013, but it was closed in 2020 due to the COVID-19 pandemic. They were nominated for the James Beard Foundation Award Best New Restaurant in 2014. It was opened inside a former strip mall pizza place.

Tickets to dine on a five-course meal were sold in the morning for just under $100.

== See also ==
- List of defunct restaurants of the United States
- List of French restaurants
- List of Michelin-starred restaurants in California
