= Wako (restaurant) =

Japanese restaurant in San Francisco, California, U.S.

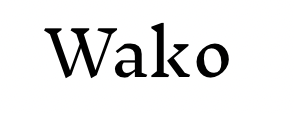
- Interactive map of Wako

Restaurant information
- Food type: Japanese
- Location: 211 Clement Street, San Francisco, California, 94118, United States
- Coordinates: 37°46′58.7″N 122°27′41.6″W
- Website: sushiwakosf.com

Wako is a Japanese restaurant in San Francisco's Richmond District, in California.

The restaurant specializes in sushi and has received a Michelin star.

== See also ==
- List of Japanese restaurants
- List of Michelin-starred restaurants in California
- List of sushi restaurants
