= Rasa (restaurant) =

Indian restaurant in Burlingame, California, U.S.

- Interactive map of Rasa

Restaurant information
- Established: October 2014
- Owners: Ajay Walia, Reena Miglani
- Head chef: Ajay Walia
- Food type: Contemporary Indian
- Location: 209 Park Road, Burlingame, California, 94010, United States
- Coordinates: 37°34′39″N 122°20′46″W
- Website: www.rasaindian.com

Rasa is an Indian restaurant in Burlingame, California, United States, owned by Ajay Walia and his wife Reena Miglani. It opened in 2014 and the following year, under chef Vijay Kumar became the first Indian restaurant in California to be awarded a Michelin star. In 2022 it closed and became a branch of the owners' casual restaurant, Saffron. It reopened in 2024, with Walia as executive chef.

== History ==
With his wife Reena Miglani, Ajay Walia opened Rasa in October 2014 in a space formerly occupied by an Indian bistro, with the objective of making Indian cuisine, particularly South Indian cuisine, a fine dining option in the San Francisco Bay area. In October 2015, under chef Vijay Kumar, the restaurant won a Michelin star, the first Indian restaurant in California to do so. In 2016 the restaurant critic for the San Francisco Chronicle called it "clearly the best Indian restaurant I have found in the Bay Area."

Kumar left Rasa in 2021 and moved to New York City, where he became head chef at Semma. In May 2022, after COVID-19 pandemic restrictions on indoor dining made it difficult to operate a fine dining restaurant, and after reevaluating the pressure of retaining the Michelin star, Walia and Miglani closed Rasa and made it a branch of Saffron, their casual Indian restaurant in San Carlos, opened in 2003, which serves both North and South Indian food.

Rasa reopened on October 15, 2024.

== Restaurant ==
Rasa occupies the first floor and mezzanine of 209 Park Road in Burlingame. Originally it served primarily South Indian cuisine; for the reopening, the menu has been updated to be more broadly contemporary Indian with emphasis on seasonal ingredients. The dining room was predominantly black with color accents based on spices; after its redecoration as Saffron, the decor became lighter, using white with oak wood, and it has retained wallpaper and is now more brightly colored.

== See also ==
- List of Indian restaurants
- List of Michelin-starred restaurants in California
