= 715 (restaurant) =

Japanese restaurant in Los Angeles, California, U.S.

- Interactive map of 715

Restaurant information
- Head chef: Seigo Tamura
- Food type: Japanese
- Location: 738 E 3rd Street, Los Angeles, California, 90013, United States
- Coordinates: 34.0455°N 118.2368°W
- Seating capacity: 8-seat counter
- Reservations: Required
- Other information: 20-course omakase

715, or 715 Sushi, is a Michelin-starred Japanese restaurant in the Arts District neighborhood of Los Angeles, California, United States.

== See also ==
- List of Japanese restaurants
- List of Michelin-starred restaurants in California
