= Madrona Manor =

Historic house in California, United States

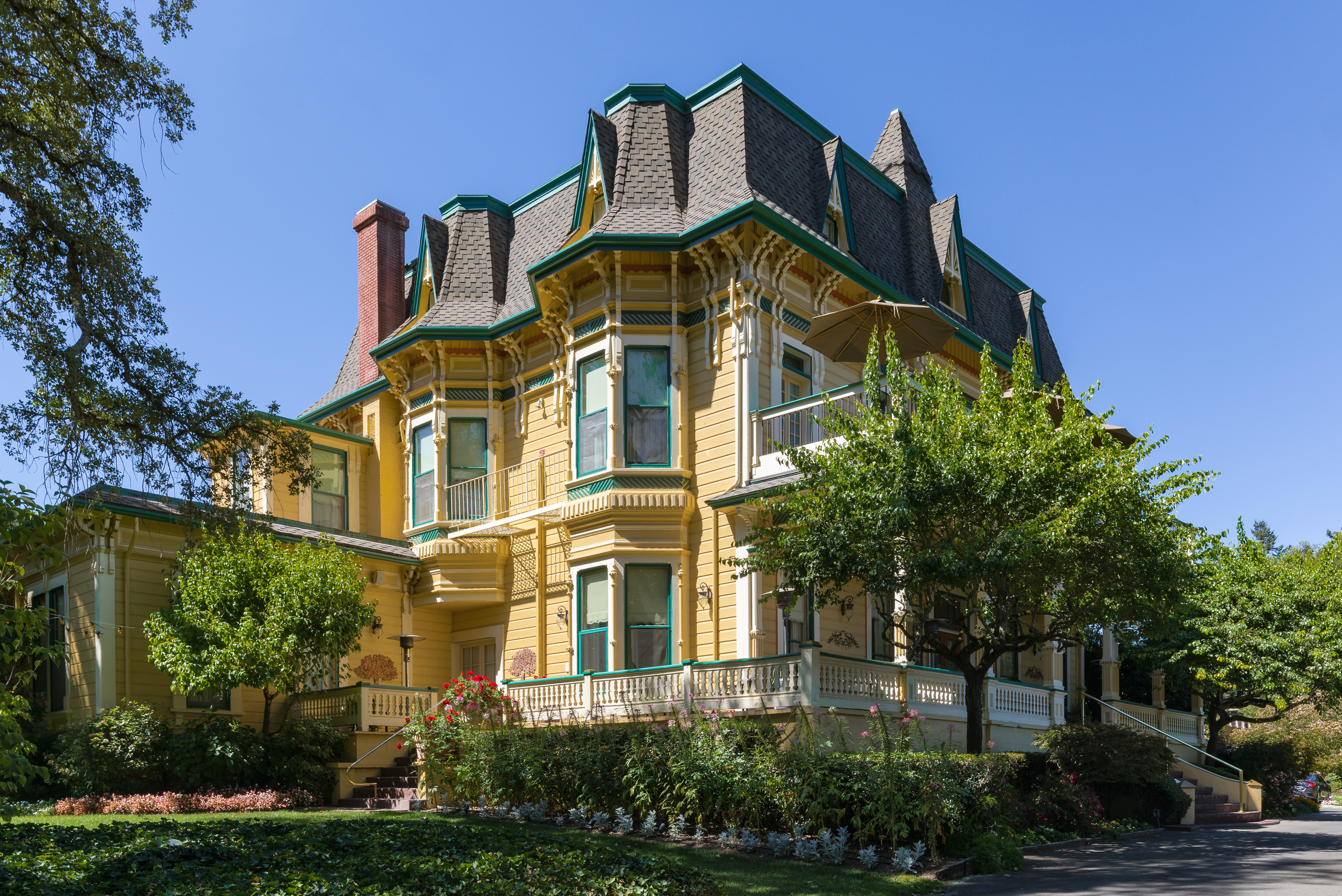

- Location within California
- Former names: Madrona Knoll Rancho

General information
- Type: Bed and breakfast
- Architectural style: Victorian (Second Empire)
- Location: 1001 Westside Road, Sonoma County, California, near Healdsburg, United States
- Coordinates: 38°36′17″N 122°53′07″W
- Construction started: 1880
- Completed: 1881
- Renovated: 1905
- Cost: $12,000
- Client: John A. Paxton
- Owner: Bill and Trudi Konrad

Technical details
- Floor count: 3
- Floor area: 8,400 sq ft (780 m^{2})

Design and construction
- Architects: Ludwig and Guerne

Website
- www.madronamanor.com
- Madrona Manor
- U.S. National Register of Historic Places
- Area: 7.92 acres (3.2 ha)
- NRHP reference No.: 87000573
- Added to NRHP: April 2, 1987
- Interactive map of Madrona Manor

Restaurant information
- Established: 1981
- Head chef: Jesse Mallgren
- Food type: California cuisine
- Rating: (Michelin Guide)
- Reservations: Yes

Madrona Manor is a Victorian-era Wine Country bed and breakfast inn near Healdsburg, in Sonoma County, California, United States, featuring a Michelin-starred restaurant.

== History ==
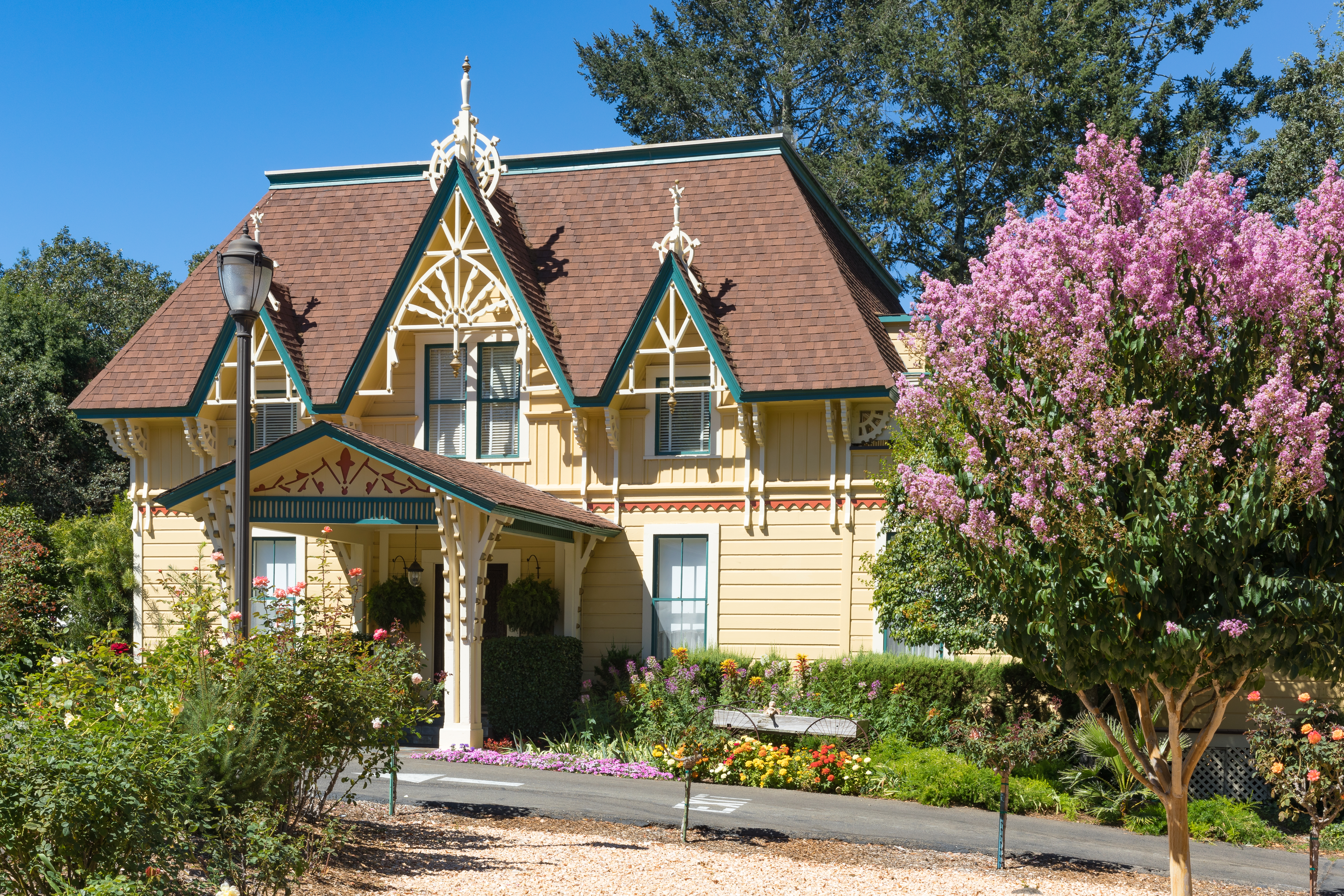
The Carriage House

In 1879, John Alexander Paxton, a wealthy San Franciscan, bought 260 acres (105.2 ha) of land in the Dry Creek Valley area for $10,500. He named this property, just west of Healdsburg, "Madrona Knoll Rancho" as the word "Madrona" is the local term for an Arbutus species, notably the distinctive small tree Arbutus menziesii. In 1880–1881, he built a 17-room, three-story gabled mansion on the property, to which he commuted on weekends from his work in the city.

Paxton died in 1888, leaving 1/4 of his estate to his sister-in-law Mary McClellan, 9/16 to his wife, Hannah McClellan Paxton, and 3/16 to his second son, Charles. He disinherited his eldest son, Blitz, due to disappointment. After Hannah died in 1902, the estate was neglected. Charles died in 1910, leaving Blitz to administer the property. He subdivided the land, and sold 218.32 acres (88.4 ha) along with the buildings to D. H. Botchford in 1918 for $17,500.

In 1981, the property (then down to eight acres) was turned from a family residence into a country inn by new owner John Harry Muir. The Manor was added to the National Register of Historic Places on 2 April 1987. It is also a Sonoma County Historic Landmark.

Bill and Trudi Konrad purchased the Manor in 1999.

In 2006 it was briefly reported that Francis Ford Coppola had purchased the mansion, but a few weeks later the Konrads announced that they could not reach an agreement.

== Lodging ==
The inn has 23 guest rooms and suites, some of which are in the Carriage House (also built in 1880) and private cottages. The grounds are a popular location for weddings and weekend getaways from San Francisco and Silicon Valley.

== Restaurant ==
Muir had used his children as chefs, but in 1999 the Konrads brought in Jesse Mallgren to run their restaurant. Since then, he has become one of the area's finest chefs, culminating in the restaurant being awarded a Michelin star in 2008.

Begun during Muir's ownership are the annual "Dickens Dinners." The November and December dinners feature entertainment along with traditional holiday dishes made with local seasonal ingredients.
