= Al's Place (restaurant) =

Defunct restaurant in San Francisco, California, U.S.

- Interactive map of Al's Place

Restaurant information
- Established: February 4, 2015
- Closed: August 2022
- Owner: Aaron London
- Food type: New American
- Location: 1499 Valencia Street, San Francisco, California, 94110, United States
- Coordinates: 37°44′56.5″N 122°25′12.5″W
- Seating capacity: 46
- Website: www.alsplacesf.com

Al's Place, commonly stylized as AL's Place, was a New American restaurant in San Francisco's Mission District. Aaron London was the owner.

London closed Al's Place in August 2022 to focus on his family, and distribute sub-contracted six-month shelf-stable $10 bags of cookies.

It held one Michelin star since 2016.

== History ==
Aaron London opened Al's Place on February 4, 2015, after a two-month renovation.

== See also ==
- List of defunct restaurants of the United States
- List of Michelin-starred restaurants in California
- List of New American restaurants
