= Asanebo =

Japanese restaurant in Los Angeles, California, U.S.

- Interactive map of Asanebo

Restaurant information
- Head chef: Tetsuya Nakao
- Food type: Japanese
- Location: 11941 Ventura Boulevard, Los Angeles - Studio City, California, 91604, United States
- Coordinates: 34°8′37″N 118°23′30.5″W
- Website: asanebo-restaurant.com

Asanebo is a Japanese restaurant in Studio City, California, United States. The menu includes sushi.

== Reception ==
Time Out Los Angeles gave the restaurant 4 out of 5 stars. The Michelin Guide awarded Asanebo one Michelin star from 2008 to 2009.

== See also ==
- List of Japanese restaurants
- List of sushi restaurants
- List of Michelin-starred restaurants in California
