= Shibumi (restaurant) =

Restaurant in Los Angeles, California, U.S.

- Interactive map of Shibumi

Restaurant information
- Closed: July 19, 2025
- Head chef: David Schlosser
- Food type: Japanese
- Rating: (Michelin Guide)
- Location: 815 South Hill Street, Los Angeles, California, 90014, United States
- Coordinates: 34°2′39.2″N 118°15′22.6″W
- Website: www.shibumidtla.com

Shibumi was a Michelin Guide-starred restaurant in Los Angeles, California, United States, that served Japanese cuisine.

The restaurant permanently closed in July 2025.

== See also ==
- List of defunct restaurants of the United States
- List of Michelin-starred restaurants in California
