= Mori Sushi =

Defunct Japanese restaurant in Los Angeles, California, U.S.

- Interactive map of Mori Sushi

Restaurant information
- Food type: Japanese
- Location: 11500 W Pico Boulevard, Los Angeles, California, 90064, United States
- Coordinates: 34°2′0″N 118°26′32″W
- Website: morisushila.com

Mori Sushi was a Japanese restaurant in Los Angeles, California. The menu featured sushi.

== Reception ==
Mori Sushi received a Michelin star in the 2008 and 2009 editions of the Michelin Guide. Mori Sushi lost its Michelin rating in 2022.

== See also ==
- List of defunct restaurants of the United States
- List of Japanese restaurants
- List of Michelin-starred restaurants in California
