= List of defunct restaurants of the United States =

Below is a list of notable defunct restaurants of the United States.

== Defunct restaurants in the United States ==
- Aunt Jemima's Kitchen
- Big Daddy's Restaurants
- Bikinis Sports Bar & Grill
- Bill Knapp's
- Blue Boar Cafeterias
- Boston Sea Party
- Bresler's Ice Cream
- Briazz
- Brigham's – a Boston-area ice cream parlor and restaurant chain that closed in 2013
- Britling Cafeterias
- Bugaboo Creek Steakhouse
- Burger Chef
- Carrols Restaurant Group
- Cheeseburger in Paradise
- Chi-Chi's
- Childs Restaurants
- China Coast
- Clifton's Cafeteria
- Clock
- Coon Chicken Inn
- Cuppy's Coffee
- Deco Refreshments, Inc.
- Dee's Drive-In
- Don Pablo's – closed in 2019
- Druther's
- Dubrow's Cafeteria
- Earl Abel's
- Farrell's Ice Cream Parlour
- Forum Cafeterias
- Fresh Choice
- Geri's Hamburgers
- Gino's Hamburgers
- Henry's Hamburgers
- Holly Tree Inn
- Horn & Hardart
- Horne's
- Hot Chicken Takeover
- Hot Shoppes, Inc.
- Howard Johnson's
- Huyler's
- Isaly's
- JB's Restaurants
- Jumbo's, Miami, Florida
- Kahiki Supper Club
- Kenny Rogers Roasters
- King's Food Host
- La Petite Boulangerie
- Laughner's Cafeteria
- Little Tavern
- Lone Star Steakhouse – parent company for other restaurants
- Lum's
- Lyon's
- Manning's Cafeterias
- Mighty Casey's
- Minnie Pearl's Fried Chicken
- Montana's Cookhouse
- Morrison's Cafeteria
- Mr. Fables
- Mr. Steak
- Nedick's
- Nickerson Farms
- Official All Star Café
- Pioneer Chicken
- Po' Folk's – once owned by actor Burt Reynolds
- Pok Pok – Portland, Oregon and New York City
- Red Barn
- Rio Bravo Cantina
- Roadhouse Grill
- The Royal Canadian Pancake Houses
- Rustler Steak House
- S&W Cafeteria
- Sambo's
- Sandy's
- Schrafft's
- Sholl's Colonial Cafeteria
- ShopHouse Southeast Asian Kitchen
- ShowBiz Pizza Place
- Signatures
- Sisters Chicken & Biscuits – founded in 1979, this was Wendy's first attempt to expand beyond burgers
- Sokolowski's University Inn, Cleveland, Ohio
- Soul Daddy
- Specialty Restaurant Group
- Steak and Ale
- Steve's Ice Cream
- Sweet Tomatoes – Founded in San Diego in 1978 and operated as Souplantation in California. Closed all locations temporarily in March 2020 due to the COVID-19 pandemic, but announced in May 2020 that the closure was permanent. One location reopened under new ownership in April 2024 in Tucson, AZ.
- Tasty Made
- Texas Land and Cattle – peaked at 20 locations, only 1 remains in Austin
- Two Pesos
- Valle's Steak House
- Velvet Turtle
- Victoria Station – one restaurant remained open in Salem, Massachusetts until it was abruptly closed in December 2017
- VIP's – Oregon-based restaurant chain
- Wag's
- Weenie Beenie
- Wetson's
- Whiskey Soda Lounge – Portland, Oregon and New York City
- White Tower Hamburgers
- Wimpy Grills – founded in Bloomington, Indiana, in 1934; eventually grew to 25 locations within the United States and 1,500 outside of the U.S.; its international locations were eventually sold to J. Lyons and Co. in the United Kingdom, which remains open while all of the American locations eventually closed by 1978
- Yankee Doodle Dandy
- York Steak House – one restaurant remains open in Columbus, Ohio
- Young Joni
- Zantigo – a revival of the Zantigo menu and format has seven restaurants in Minneapolis, Minnesota

=== California ===
- Adega
- Al's Place
- All-American Burger
- Animal
- Anthology
- Aphotic, San Francisco
- Aster, San Francisco
- Atomic Cafe
- Avery, San Francisco
- Bahooka
- Bastide, West Hollywood
- Battle of the Dance
- Baumé
- Ben Frank's
- La Botte, Santa Monica
- Britannia Pub, Santa Monica
- Brown Derby
- Burger Continental, Pasadena
- Campanile, Los Angeles
- C.C. Brown's
- Café Montmartre
- Chasen's
- Chez TJ
- Coi, San Francisco
- Commonwealth, San Francisco
- Dialogue, Santa Monica
- Dive!
- Edinburgh Castle Pub, San Francisco
- The Fat Cow
- Florentine Gardens
- La Folie, San Francisco
- Cafe Frankenstein
- Googies Coffee Shop
- Gucci Osteria da Massimo Bottura, Beverly Hills
- Hamburger Hamlet
- Hatfield's, Hollywood
- Imperial Dynasty
- In Situ, San Francisco
- Johnie's Broiler
- Johnie's Coffee Shop
- La Botte, Santa Monica
- The Linkery
- Little Joe's
- Kinjo
- Lord Stanley, San Francisco
- Ma Maison
- Manresa, Los Gatos
- Manzke, Los Angeles
- Marlena
- Maud's
- Maude, Beverly Hills
- Maum, Palo Alto
- The Misfit
- Mori Sushi, Los Angeles
- Moore's Delicatessen
- Mourad, San Francisco
- Naugles
- Nicky Blair's
- Nico, San Francisco
- Noriega Hotel
- Nova Express Café
- Old Spaghetti Factory Cafe, San Francisco
- Original Spanish Kitchen
- Ortolan, Los Angeles
- Osito, San Francisco
- Pasta Bravo
- Patina, Los Angeles
- Perino's
- Phenakite, Los Angeles
- PUMP Restaurant & Lounge
- Pup 'N' Taco
- Rasa, Burlingame
- The Restaurant at Meadowood, St. Helena
- Scrivner's Drive-In
- Schwartz & Sandy's
- Shibumi
- Ships Coffee Shop
- Swensen's
- Taco María, Costa Mesa
- The Shota, San Francisco
- Tiny Naylor's
- Trois Mec, Hollywood
- Uka, Hollywood
- Urasawa, Beverly Hills
- Valentino, Santa Monica
- Van de Kamp's Holland Dutch Bakeries
- Villa Blanca
- Wich Stand
- Zombie Hut

=== Illinois ===
- 42 Grams, Chicago"Two Michelin-Starred 42 Grams Closes After 3 1/2 Years". Eater Chicago. June 5, 2017.
- Acadia, Chicago
- Avenues, Chicago
- Band of Bohemia, Chicago
- Blackbird, Chicago
- Blackhawk, Chicago
- Brasserie Jo, Chicago
- Chez Paul, Chicago
- Claudia, Chicago
- Courtright's, Chicago
- Crofton on Wells, Chicago
- Elizabeth, Chicago
- Entente, Chicago
- Everest, Chicago
- Fat Rice, Chicago
- Grace
- The Great Gritzbe's Flying Food Show
- GreenRiver
- L2O
- Mexique, Chicago
- Michael Jordan's Restaurant
- Moto
- Parachute, Chicago
- The Pump Room
- RIA
- Senza
- Sixteen
- Tru

=== Maryland ===
- Anchor Inn
- Chicken George
- Martick's Restaurant Francais
- Maryland Food Collective
- Punk's Backyard Grill
- White Coffee Pot

=== Massachusetts ===
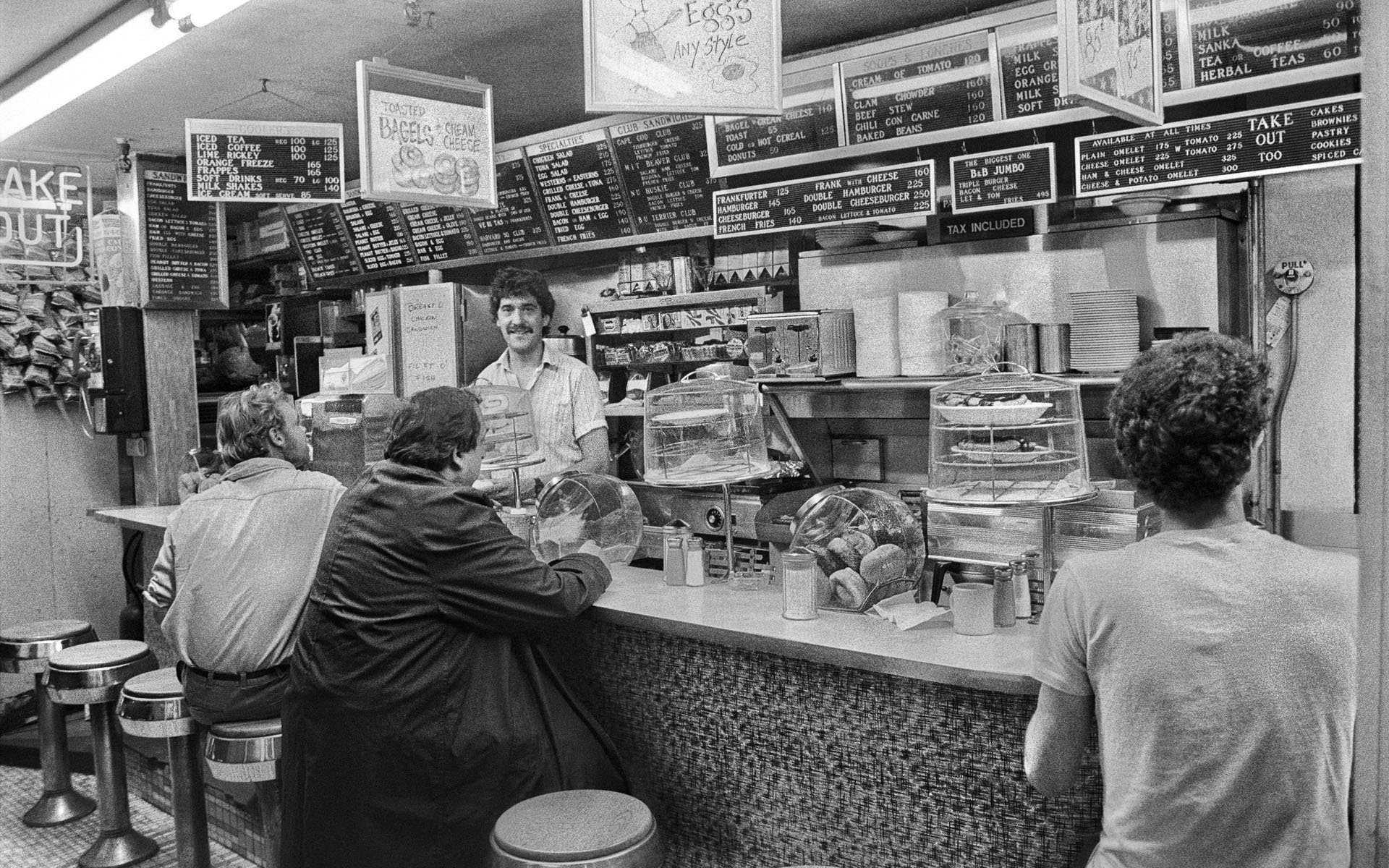
Tasty Sandwich Shop

- Anthony's Pier 4
- Biba
- Brigham's Ice Cream
- Doyle's Cafe
- Durgin-Park
- East Coast Grill
- L'Espalier
- Hilltop Steak House
- Jacob Wirth Restaurant
- Locke-Ober
- Tasty Sandwich Shop
- Upstairs On the Square

=== Missouri ===
- Pope's Cafeteria

=== North Carolina ===
- Blueberry Hill

=== Nevada ===
- Alex
- Andre's
- DB Brasserie
- The Green Shack
- Heart Attack Grill
- Picasso

=== New York ===
- A Voce Columbus, New York City
- Agern, New York City
- Aldea, New York City
- Alto, New York City
- Anthos, New York City
- Asti
- Bar Uchū, New York City
- Beefsteak Charlie's
- Benno, New York City
- Bistro Citron, West 83rd Street and Amsterdam, New York City
- Bridge Cafe
- Browne's Chop House
- Brushstroke, New York City
- Café des Artistes
- Café Gray, New York City
- Cafe Rouge
- La Caravelle
- Carnegie Deli
- The Cattleman
- Cafe Chambord
- Chanterelle, New York City
- Chelsea Place
- Cloud Club
- The Coffee Shop
- The Colony
- Contra
- Convivio
- Corton
- La Côte Basque
- Da Silvano
- Del Pezzo Restaurant
- Devi
- Dovetail, New York City
- Elaine's
- Fashion Cafe
- Fiamma Osteria, New York City
- Fleur de Sel, New York City
- Florent
- FOOD
- The Gaslight Cafe
- Heartbreak, New York City
- Jekyll & Hyde Club
- Jewel Bako, New York City
- Jimmy Ryan's
- Jimmy Weston's
- Joomak Banjum
- Juni, New York City
- Kajitsu, New York City
- Kiev Restaurant
- Kyo Ya, New York City
- Lafayette
- Lespinasse
- Lindy's
- Lo Scalco, New York City
- Lobster Palace
- Lüchow's
- Lundy's Restaurant
- Lutèce
- Manganaro's
- Mars 2112
- Maxwell's Plum
- Mo Gridder's
- Moondance Diner
- Moon's Lake House
- Mori
- Munson Diner
- Nix
- Café Nicholson
- Oak Room
- Okuda, New York City
- Onyx Club
- Pearl Oyster Bar
- Le Pavillon
- Penny Cafeteria
- Piora, New York City
- Public, New York City
- The Quilted Giraffe
- Quo Vadis
- Ratner's
- Rebelle, New York City
- Red Apple Rest
- Reisenweber's Cafe
- Reuben's Restaurant
- Rhong-Tiam, New York City
- Rosanjin, New York City
- Saul, New York City
- Semilla, New York City
- Shanley's Restaurants
- Sherry's
- La Sirena, New York City
- Soto, New York City
- The Spotted Pig
- Stage Deli
- Stock Exchange Luncheon Club
- Stork Club
- Take Root, New York City
- Telepan, New York City
- Toots Shor's Restaurant
- La Tulipe, New York City
- Tulsi, New York City
- Ukiyo, New York City
- Veritas, New York City
- Windows on the World
- WWF New York

=== Oregon ===
In addition to those in Portland, following are notable defunct restaurants in Oregon:

- Nick's Italian Cafe, McMinnville
- Okta, McMinnville
- Tad's Chicken 'n Dumplins

=== Pennsylvania ===
- Le Bec-Fin
- Horn & Hardart
- Old Original Bookbinder's
- Palumbo's
- Tun Tavern

=== Texas ===
- Benjy's, Houston
- Dolce Vita, Houston
- Inversion Coffee House, Houston
- Shady Grove, Austin
- Trump Burger
- Yia Yia Mary's, Houston

=== Washington ===
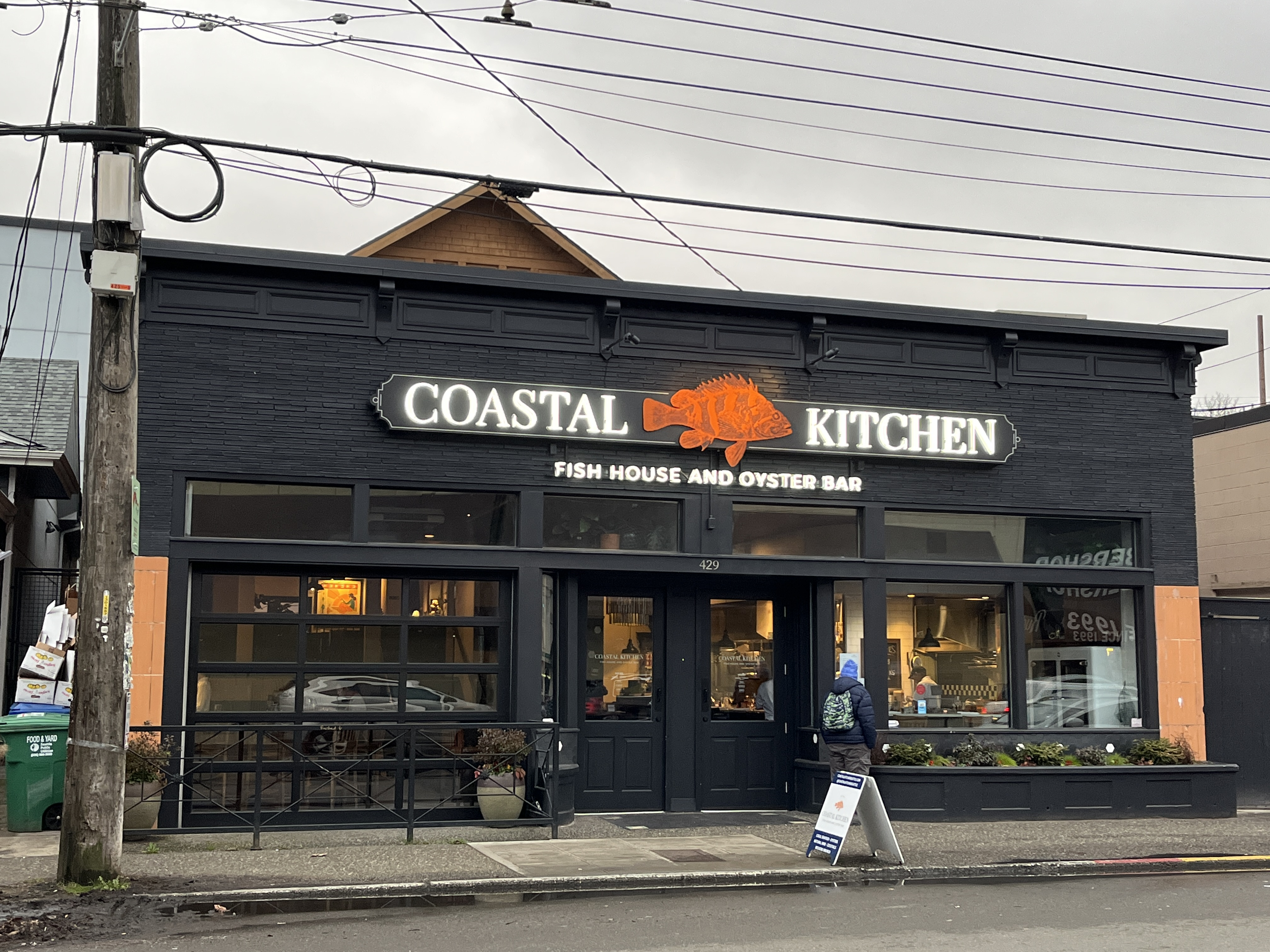
Coastal Kitchen

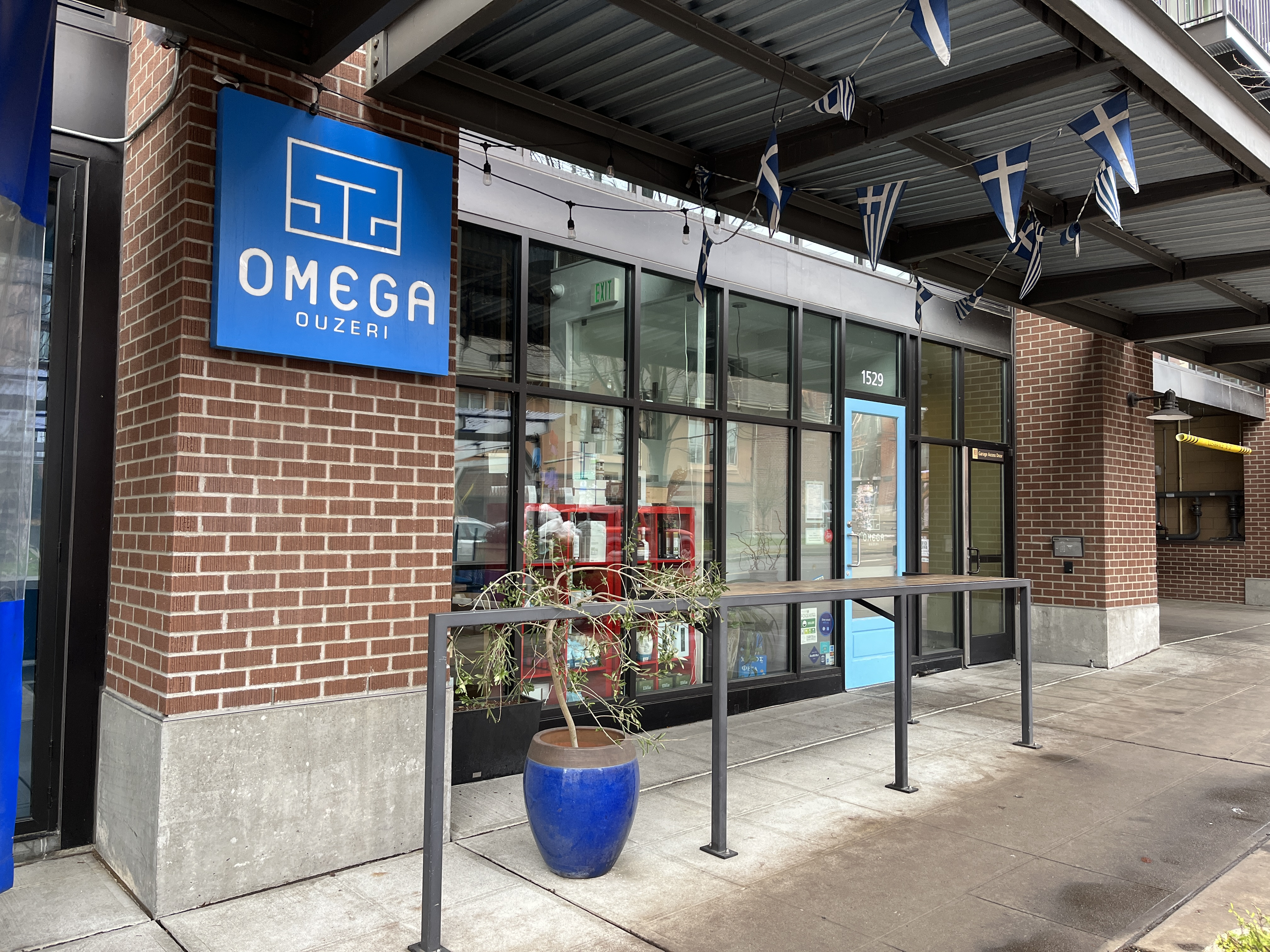
Omega Ouzeri

- ʔálʔal Café, Seattle
- Andy's Diner, Seattle
- Barrio, Seattle
- Boca, Seattle
- Bok a Bok
- Burbs Burgers
- Coastal Kitchen, Seattle
- Country Dough, Seattle
- Crush, Seattle
- Dacha Diner, Seattle
- Dahlia Lounge, Seattle
- Eastern Cafe, Seattle
- Eight Row, Seattle
- Foreign National
- Iron Horse, Seattle
- JuneBaby, Seattle
- Kōbo Pizza, Seattle
- Last Exit on Brooklyn, Seattle
- The London Plane, Seattle
- Loulay, Seattle
- Marmite, Seattle
- Michou Deli, Seattle
- Mt. Joy, Seattle
- Omega Ouzeri, Seattle
- Pizzeria Credo, Seattle
- Pizzeria Gabbiano, Seattle
- Plum Bistro
- Poppy, Seattle
- Rancho Bravo Tacos
- Restaurant Marché, Bainbridge Island
- Salare, Seattle
- Seabird, Bainbridge Island
- Shanghai Garden Restaurant, Seattle
- Shikorina, Seattle
- Sitka and Spruce, Seattle
- SkyCity, Seattle
- Sophon, Seattle
- Stateside
- Taku, Seattle
- Tin Table, Seattle
- Vito's, Seattle

== See also ==
- Lists of companies
- List of defunct fast-food restaurant chains
- List of defunct retailers of the United States
