= Hemant Mathur =

American chef and restaurateur

Hemant Mathur is an Indian-American two Michelin-starred chef and restaurateur based in New York City. He is known for his work at Michelin-starred Indian restaurants including Devi and Tulsi, where he earned two Michelin stars. His work and recipes has been featured in The New York Times, Eater'', and Forbes.

== Biography ==
He began his culinary career at the age of 17 as an apprentice at the Rambagh Palace Taj Hotel in Jaipur. He worked at the Taj Mahal Hotel and Taj Jai Mahal Palace Hotel, as well as Pakwan at the Le Méridien Hotel in New Delhi. He later worked at Bukhara at the Maurya Sheraton Hotel in New Delhi. He later worked as a private chef for British financier Sir James Goldsmith in Mexico before moving to the United States.

== Career ==
After moving to New York City, Mathur worked as executive chef at Diwan Grill before joining chef Raji Jallepalli at Tamarind. In 2003, he opened Amma, where he served as co-chef.

In 2004, Mathur became one of the founding chefs of Devi, an Indian restaurant in Manhattan's Flatiron District. The restaurant focused on contemporary interpretations of regional Indian cuisine. In 2007, Devi became the first Indian restaurant in the United States to receive a Michelin star.

In 2011, Mathur opened Tulsi, an Indian restaurant on Manhattan's Upper East Side. The restaurant received a Michelin star following its opening. Mathur served as its executive chef until 2014.

Mathur later became involved in the development and operation of Indian restaurants in New York City, including Chola, Chote Nawab, Dhaba, Haldi, Kokum, and Malai Marke.

His later restaurant projects have included Saar Indian Bistro and Veeray da Dhaba.

In 2024, Mathur became the chef-owner of Veerays, an Indian restaurant in Midtown Manhattan. The restaurant was developed with restaurateur Sonny Solomon and chef de cuisine Binder Saini.

In 2025, Mathur became associated with Kutir, an Indian restaurant in Mamaroneck, New York.
