= Nicky Blair =

Nicky Blair may refer to:

- Nicky Blair (actor) (1926–1998), American actor, namesake of restaurant Nicky Blair's
- Nick Blair (born 1985), British businessman
