= Vestry (restaurant) =

Restaurant in New York City

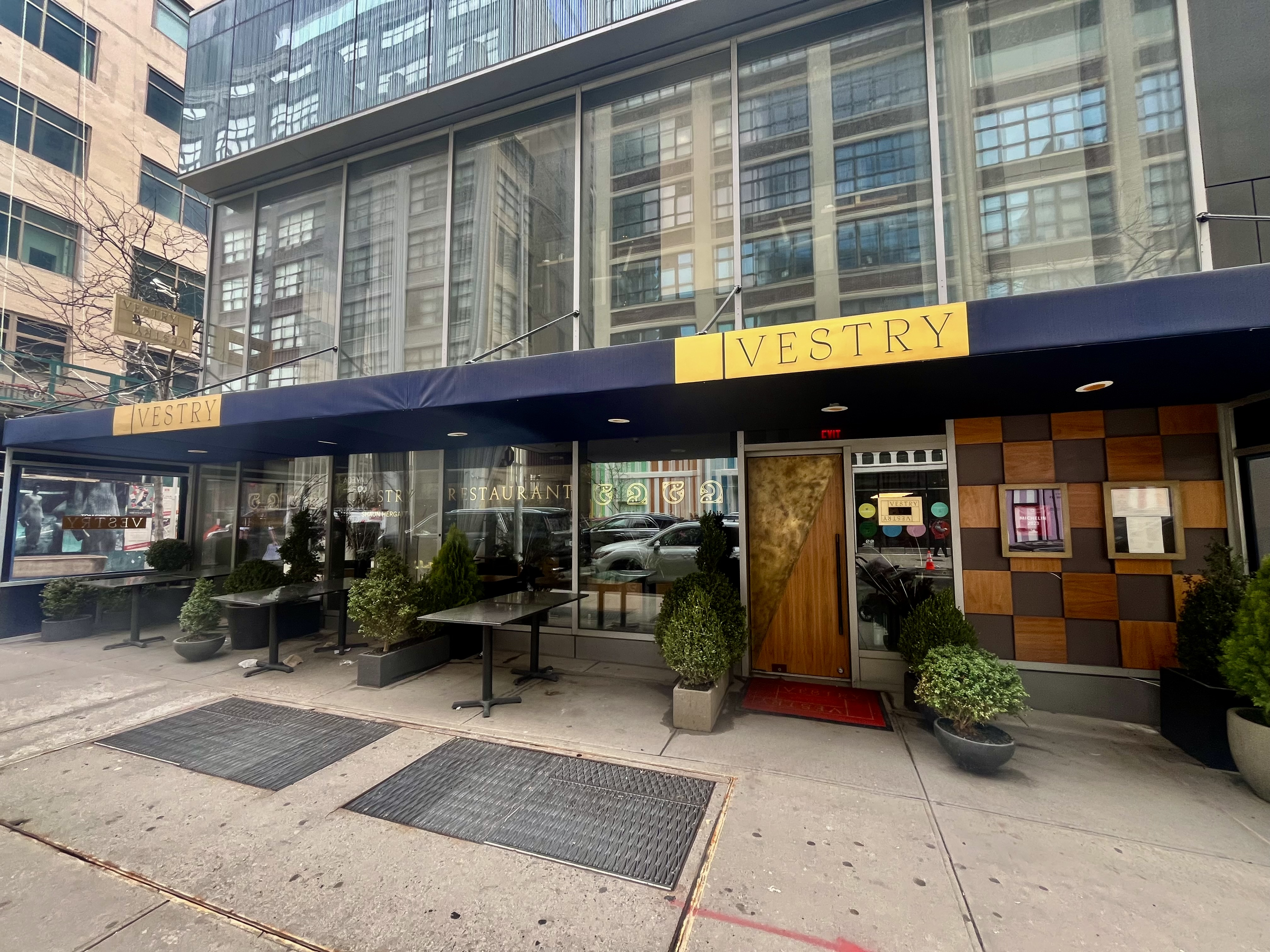
- Vestry in April 2024
- Interactive map of Vestry

Restaurant information
- Established: October 2, 2020
- Closed: September 2025
- Head chef: Shaun Hergatt
- Food type: Seafood
- Location: 246 Spring Street, New York, New York, 10013
- Coordinates: 40°43′31″N 74°0′20″W
- Website: www.vestrynyc.com

Vestry was a restaurant in New York City run by Shaun Hergatt. Opened in 2020, the restaurant had a seafood-based menu combining American and Japanese cuisine. It maintained a Michelin star from 2021–2023. It closed in September 2025 when its lease was not renewed by ownership.

== See also ==
- List of defunct restaurants of the United States
- List of Michelin-starred restaurants in New York City
- List of seafood restaurants
