= Osito =

Restaurant in San Francisco, California, U.S.

- Interactive map of Osito

Restaurant information
- Established: October 15, 2021
- Closed: May 11, 2025
- Owner: Seth Stowaway
- Chef: Seth Stowaway
- Food type: Live-fire California cuisine
- Rating: 1 Michelin star
- Location: 2875 18th Street, San Francisco, California, 94110, United States
- Coordinates: 37°45′42″N 122°24′39″W
- Website: ositorestaurant.com

Osito was a restaurant in San Francisco, California, opened in October 2021 by chef Seth Stowaway and using exclusively live-fire cooking over a wood fire. It held a Michelin star. It closed in May 2025.

== History ==
In partnership with Jenn Yoo, Seth Stowaway opened Osito on October 15, 2021. Stowaway, who had been executive chef at Bar Agricole, named it for his nickname, which means "little bear". Originally planned for early 2020, the opening was preceded by trial pop-ups and was delayed by the COVID-19 pandemic. Stowaway leased the space, in the Mission District, in May 2020.

It was the first entirely live-fire restaurant in the Bay Area, originally serving a tasting menu built around a different meat or seafood each evening, in two seatings at a long communal table from which about 22 diners observed the meal being cooked over wood-fed flames. The menu came to follow a monthly theme, such as "Growing Up" and "Old World Techniques". Stowaway described the cuisine as California cuisine with Latin American influences, based on his upbringing in Texas and on the Mission, where he also lives. Prior to opening, he planned to employ formerly incarcerated and rehabilitated people. The kitchen butchered whole animals and sourced produce from local farmers. Designed by Studio Terpeluk, the restaurant had dark wood panelling including reclaimed redwood and was decorated with numerous plants.

Osito later added an à la carte menu and a private dining room. An associated cocktail bar called Liliana's operated next door until December 2023; the Bar at Osito replaced it in February 2024 but closed the same month after Stowaway found running a second business distracting. The space was later a pop-up for Bar Agricole after its closure in SOMA.

In April 2025, Stowaway founded The Same Sun, a collective of independent hospitality business owners to reduce operating costs by pooling resources. The following month, he announced that despite a plan to make up rent arrears, Osito had become financially unviable, and the restaurant would close permanently after brunch on Mother's Day, May 11, 2025. A farewell dinner series took place in June 2025 in the North Bay. It later emerged that for some time before its closure, Osito had been in arrears on payments to suppliers and on city and state taxes, leading to lawsuits and liens; Stowaway opened Chicken Fried Palace, a retro Southern diner, on Mission Street in December 2025, but it in turn was sued by a supplier for failure to pay and closed in summer 2026.

== Reception ==
Osito was awarded a Michelin star in December 2022 and retained it until it closed. The Michelin Guide described it as a "rustic, lodge-like spot" whose food was "both elemental and elevated"; other reviewers described it as "a breathtaking commitment to communal dining" and "both casual and special", although one found the experience more memorable than the food.

== See also ==
- List of defunct restaurants of the United States
- List of Michelin-starred restaurants in California
