= Tad's Chicken 'n Dumplins =

Defunct restaurant in the U.S. state of Oregon

- Interactive map of Tad's Chicken 'n Dumplins

Restaurant information
- Location: Oregon, United States
- Coordinates: 45.5346°N 122.3714°W

Tad's Chicken 'n Dumplins was a restaurant in the U.S state of Oregon.

== Reception ==
Mattie John Bamman included Tad's in Eater Portland's 2017 list of fifteen Oregon restaurants "worth the drive".

== See also ==
- List of defunct restaurants of the United States
