= The London Plane =

Defunct restaurant in Seattle, Washington, U.S.

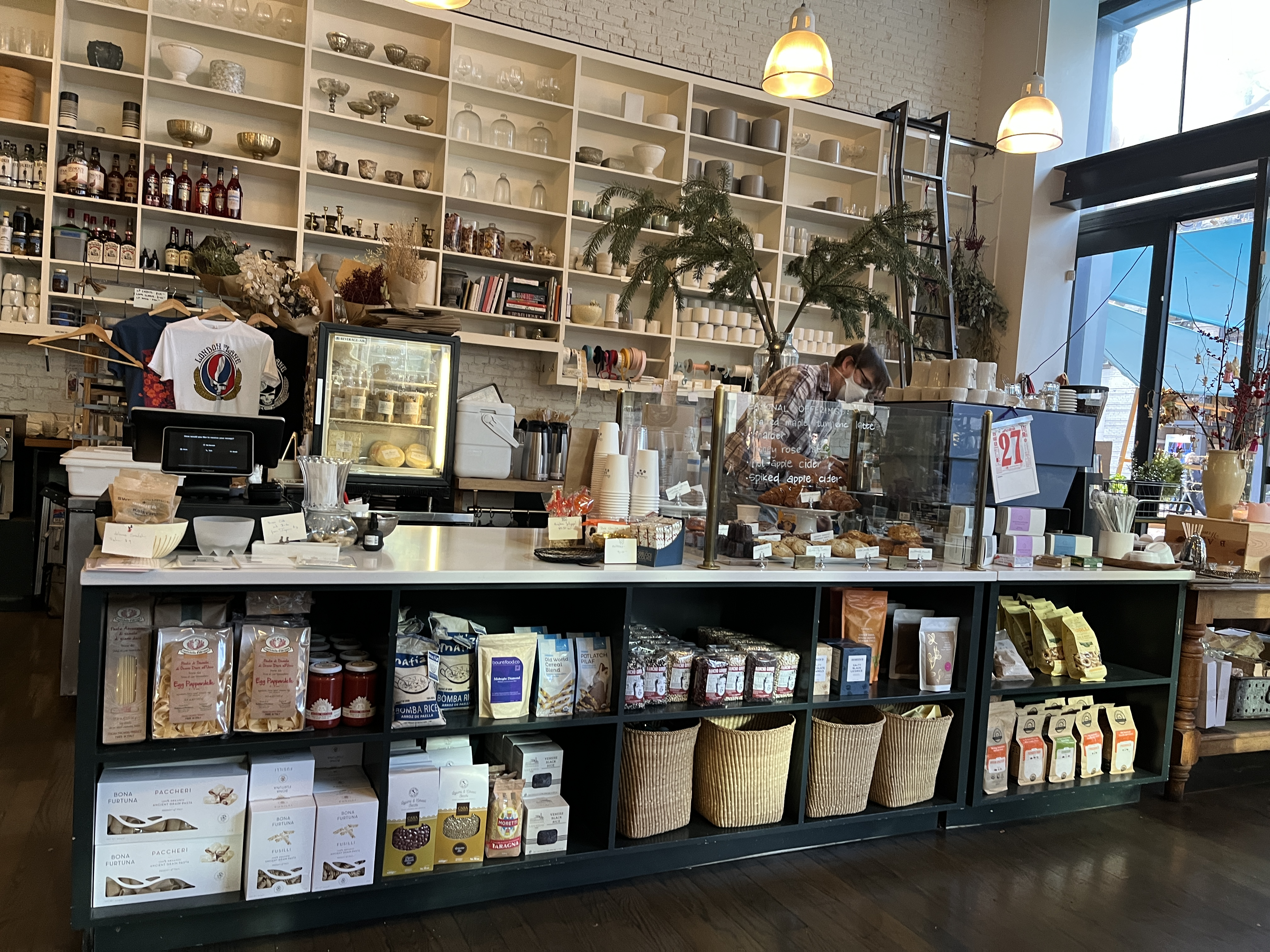
- Interior, 2022
- Interactive map of The London Plane

Restaurant information
- Location: 300 Occidental Ave. S, Seattle, King, Washington, 98104, United States
- Coordinates: 47°35′59.8″N 122°19′57.6″W

The London Plane was a restaurant, bakery, and grocery store in Seattle's Pioneer Square district, in the U.S. state of Washington.

== Description ==
The London Plane operated as a restaurant, bakery, and shop which carried flowers, wine, and other groceries. The cafe had salads with grains, egg dishes with produce, and shared plates with cheese, deviled eggs, or labneh. The Seattle Metropolitan included the business in a 2022 overview of the city's 100 best restaurants.

== History ==
Matt Dillon opened The London Plane in 2014. In 2022, owners Yasuaki Saito and Katherine Anderson announced plans to close in December.

== See also ==
- List of bakeries
- List of defunct restaurants of the United States
