= Seabird (restaurant) =

Restaurant on Bainbridge Island, Washington, U.S.

- Interactive map of Seabird

Restaurant information
- Location: 133 Winslow Way East #100, Bainbridge Island, Washington, United States
- Coordinates: 47°37′29″N 122°31′14″W
- Website: seabird.fish

Seabird was a fine dining restaurant on Bainbridge Island, Washington, United States. It closed permanently after service on September 28, 2025.

== Description ==
The fine dining restaurant Seabird operated on Bainbridge Island, Washington. According to Eater Seattle, the restaurant had "an emphasis on local and sustainable seafood and produce".

== History ==
Seabird opened in June 2022, operating in the space that previously housed Hitchcock.

Seabird closed permanently after service on September 28, 2025.

== Reception ==
Seabird was included in Esquire's list of the nation's best new restaurants in 2022 and Bon Appétit's list of the 24 best new restaurants of 2023.

== See also ==
- List of defunct restaurants of the United States
