= Boca (restaurant) =

Chain of restaurants in Seattle, Washington, U.S.

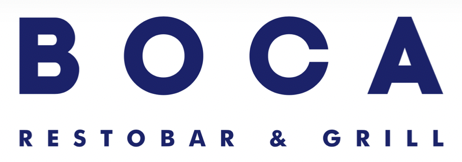

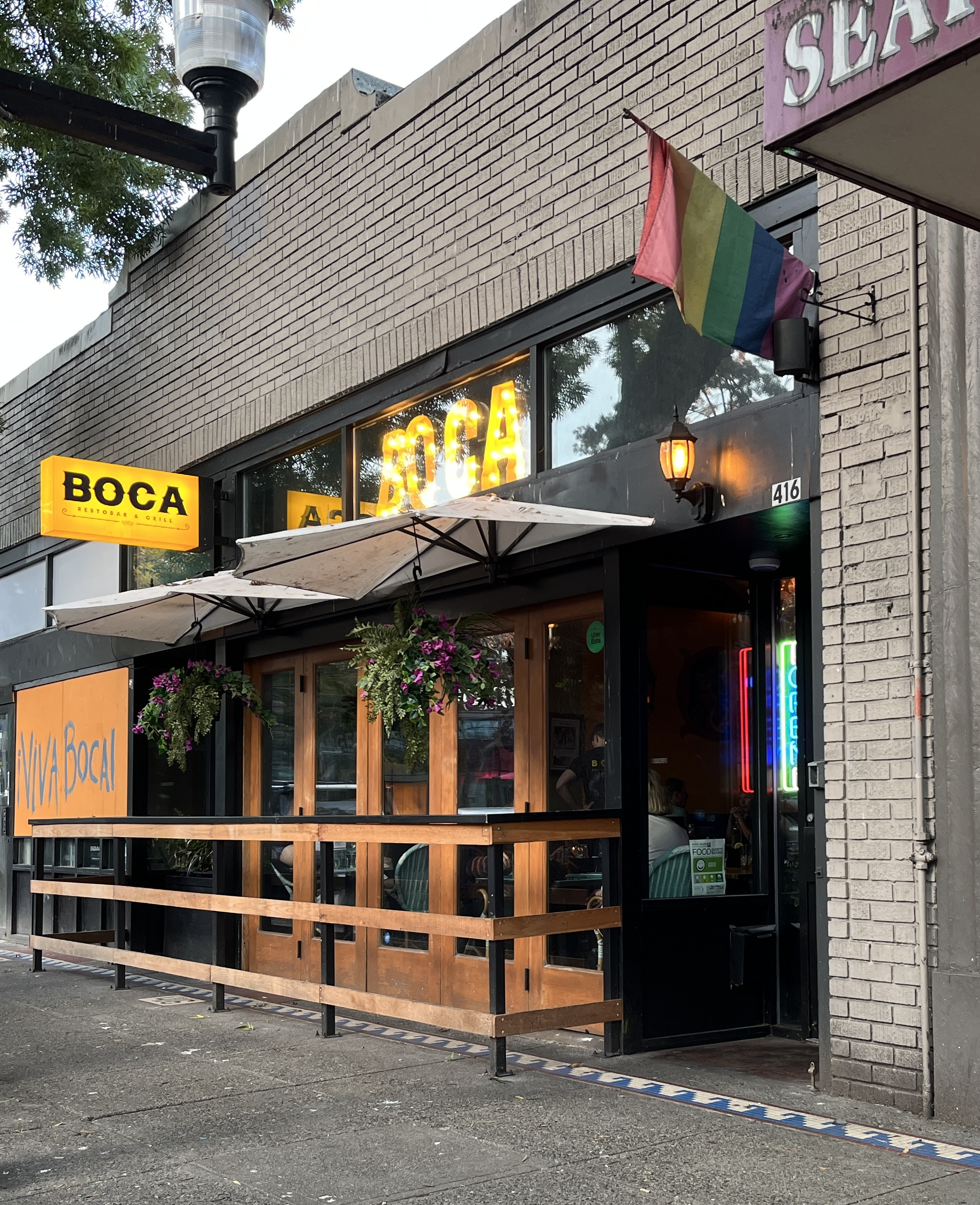
- Exterior of Boca Restobar and Grill, 2023

Restaurant information
- Location: Seattle, King, Washington, United States

Boca was the common name of a small chain of restaurants in Seattle, in the U.S. state of Washington. Locations included the Boca Restobar and Grill, Boca Restaurant at Queen City Grill, and Boca Argentine Bakery and Pizzeria.

== Description ==
Boca Restobar and Grill and the outpost Boca Restaurant at Queen City Grill were steakhouses serving Argentine cuisine. Boca Restobar and Grill was located on Broadway, on Capitol Hill, and the outpost operated in the former Queen City Grill space.

The menu at both restaurants included grilled meats, such as beef cuts, chicken, rib eye steak, sausages, and matambre (beef tenderloin with roasted vegetables, hard boiled eggs, spices, and a beef demi-glace). The restaurants also served empanadas, grilled octopus, salmon, and salads. The drink menu included the Evita (tequila, pineapple juice, and Campari) and the Ginobili, which had gin, pisco, green apple, and sage oleo.

=== Boca Argentine Bakery and Pizzeria ===
The Boca Argentine Bakery and Pizzeria was located at Broadway and Republican Street, on Capitol Hill. The interior had marble tables and black and white photography on display. French doors opened to a sidewalk patio with a white parasol and plants. The seating capacity inside was approximately 100 people.

The menu included pizza, pastries, salads, sandwiches, and other baked goods including chipa cheese breads, churros with dulce de leche, coconut coquitos, four varieties of empanadas, and pastelitos. Neapolitan pizzas used Italian toppings like mozzarella, basil, and Calabrese sausage. The drink menu included espresso, juices, and mate, as well as beer, cocktails, and wine.

== History ==
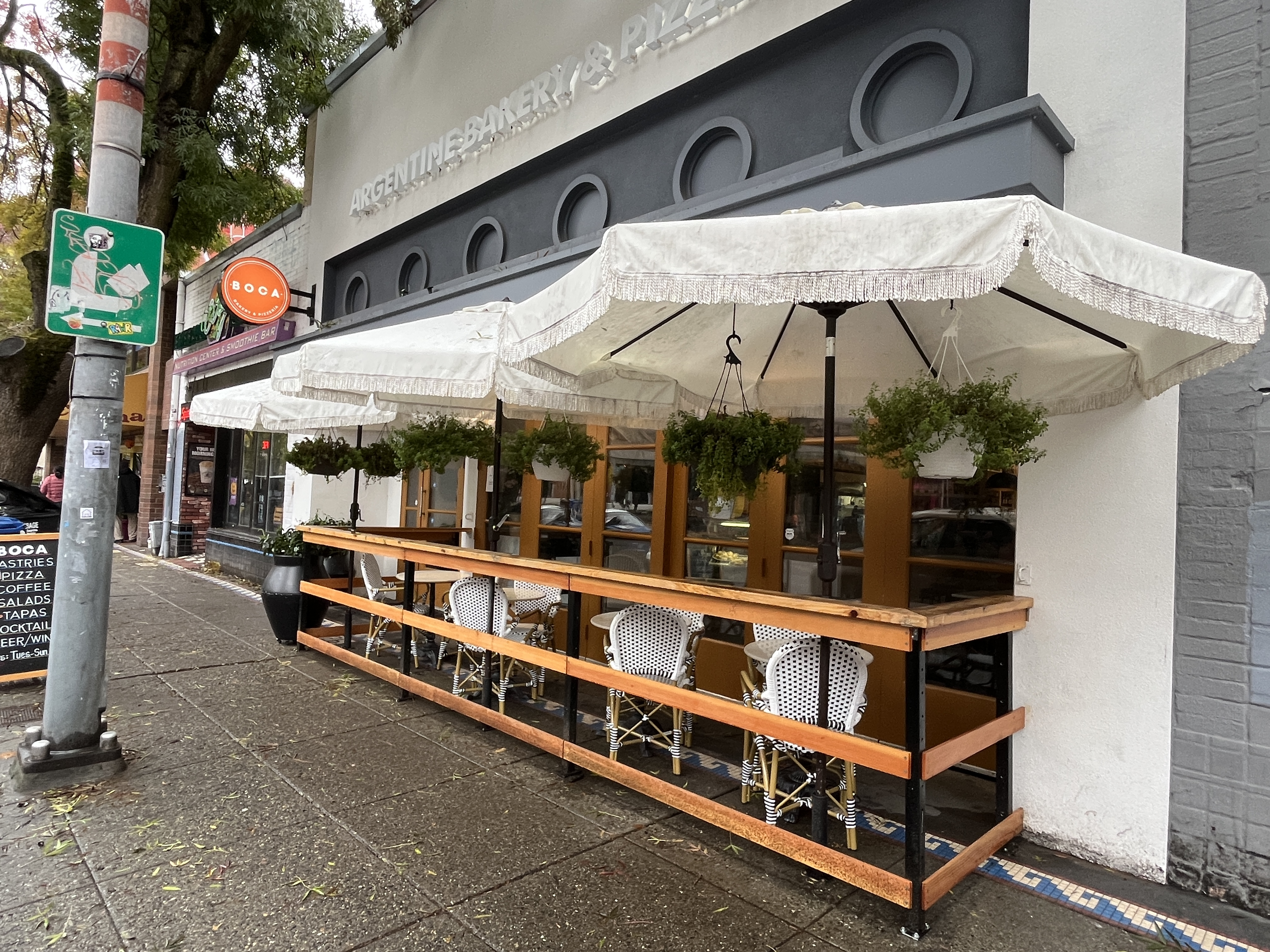
Exterior of Boca Argentine Bakery and Pizzeria, 2022

Marco Casas-Beaux was the owner. Boca Restaurant at Queen City Grill opened in February 2021.

Boca Argentine Bakery and Pizzeria opened in 2022, in a space previously occupied by Pagliacci Pizza. Molly Harrison was the pastry chef of the pizzeria. The bakery closed, and is slated to be replaced by Capitale Pizzeria.

The death of the chain's 72 year-old founder, Marco Casas Beaux, was announced on January 8, 2024, which also stated the eatery locations would temporarily close in mourning for him. However, a month later they were not only closed, but boarded up. On February 19, 2024, the news broke that Casas Beaux had died leaving unpaid rent and taxes and that the legal complexities surrounding his estate locked his daughter out of the business.

== Reception ==
In 2022, Allecia Vermillion included the bakery in Seattle Metropolitan's list of the best new restaurants, and Aimee Rizzo included its caprese empanada in The Infatuation's list of Seattle's best new dishes.

== See also ==
- List of defunct restaurants of the United States
- List of restaurant chains in the United States
