= La Botte =

Defunct restaurant in Santa Monica, California, U.S.

- Interactive map of La Botte

Restaurant information
- Closed: 2014; 12 years ago
- Head chef: Stefano De Lorenzo
- Food type: Italian
- Rating: (Michelin Guide)
- Location: 620 Santa Monica Boulevard, Santa Monica, California, 90401, United States
- Coordinates: 34°1′6.5″N 118°29′32.5″W

La Botte was a Michelin-starred, fine dining restaurant in Santa Monica, California. The restaurant closed in 2014.

== See also ==
- List of defunct restaurants of the United States
- List of Italian restaurants
- List of Michelin-starred restaurants in California
