= Aphotic (restaurant) =

Restaurant in San Francisco, California

- Interactive map of Aphotic

Restaurant information
- Established: March 21, 2023
- Closed: December 21, 2024
- Chef: Peter Hemsley
- Pastry chef: Deirdre Balao Rieutort-Louis
- Food type: Seafoods
- Rating: 1 Michelin star 1 Michelin green star
- Location: 816 Folsom Street, San Francisco, California, 94107
- Coordinates: 37.782°N 122.402°W
- Website: aphoticrestaurant.com

Aphotic was a seafood restaurant on Folsom Street in the SoMa neighborhood of San Francisco, California, with one Michelin star. It opened in March 2023 and closed in December 2024.

== Cuisine ==
Named for the deepest ocean layer, Aphotic was primarily a seafood restaurant. It served a seasonal 11-course tasting menu, and desserts included oyster-flavored icecream. The restaurant created sauce by fermenting bones and other unused parts of fish with salt and koji, and dry aged much of its fish.

Aphotic also had a distillery license and produced spirits using a rotovap, including gin infused with seaweed that is used in its martinis. It offered an extensive cocktail menu alongside its wine list. Aphotic's martini was one of three San Francisco versions listed in a 2024 Esquire "best of America" article. The non-alcoholic drinks were also seafood-related, including a zero-proof vermouth and sweet cider cocktail with a dot of uni on the glass for aroma, and a seaweed cream soda.

Reviewers noted that the restaurant's decor was very dark, in keeping with the deep undersea theme. In 2023, the Michelin Guide characterized it as a "rarified pescatarian tasting menu that abounds with personality", served in a "vast, tenebrous space", and a San Francisco Chronicle review as "groundbreaking seafood" served in a "drowned temple in the dark ocean".

== History ==
Hemsley, who had worked at Quince, opened Aphotic in March 2023 in a former warehouse; he had previously operated Palette, a restaurant and art gallery, at the same location. The following July it was awarded a Michelin star together with a green star for sustainability. The California Michelin Guide reviewers also selected pastry chef Deirdre Balao Rieutort-Louis' oyster icecream as one of their favorite desserts of 2023. In 2024, Trevin Hutchins, the bar director, received the Michelin "exceptional cocktails" award.

In October 2024, Hemsley announced that the restaurant would close on December 21, blaming lack of traffic and unsafety in the neighborhood since the COVID-19 pandemic. In late 2025, he announced he would open a cocktail bar called Jupiter Room.

== See also ==
- List of defunct restaurants of the United States
- List of Michelin-starred restaurants in California
- List of seafood restaurants
