= Sophon (restaurant) =

Cambodian restaurant in Seattle, Washington, U.S.

- Interactive map of Sophon

Restaurant information
- Food type: Cambodian
- Location: 7314 Greenwood Avenue North, Seattle, King, Washington, United States
- Coordinates: 47°40′56″N 122°21′18″W
- Website: sophonseattle.com

Sophon was a Cambodian restaurant in Seattle, Washington, United States. It was founded by Karuna Long and named one of the twenty best new restaurants of 2024 by Bon Appétit. Sophon won in the Best New Bar category of Eater Seattle's annual Eater Awards in 2024.

In February 2026, the restaurant came under investigation by the Washington Department of Labor & Industries for alleged wage theft. In the spring of 2025, former employees began complaining their checks were bouncing or being placed on hold by their banks. Additionally, employees experienced lapses in their healthcare coverage even though their premiums were still taken from their paycheck.

The restaurant closed permanently in 2026. The state had issued three tax warrants against the business for unpaid tax bills totalling over $163,000. Oliver’s Twist, a nearby cocktail bar that Long has owned since 2017, has been closed since late 2025 after falling more than $120,000 on its rent payments.

== See also ==
- List of defunct restaurants of the United States
