= Pizzeria Credo =

Defunct restaurant in Seattle, Washington, U.S.

- Interactive map of Pizzeria Credo

Restaurant information
- Owner: Jacques Nawar
- Chef: Jacques Nawar
- Location: 4520 California Avenue SW, Seattle, Washington, 98116, United States
- Coordinates: 47°33′44.1″N 122°23′11.5″W

Pizzeria Credo was a restaurant in West Seattle, in the U.S. state of Washington.

== Description ==
Pizzeria Credo was located in West Seattle. The menu included the Salad Sophia, which had approximately 80 ingredients.

== History ==
Owned by chef Jacques Nawar, the business was featured on the television series Diners, Drive-Ins and Dives. Pizzeria Credo closed in 2023.

== Reception ==
In 2022, Pizzeria Credo was one of four Washington restaurants included in Yelp's list of the top 100 places to eat, and Zuri Anderson included Pizzeria Credo in iHeart's list of Seattle's top-rated restaurants, based on Stacker. Anderson also said the business was Washington's best pizzeria in 2023.

== See also ==
- List of defunct restaurants of the United States
- List of Diners, Drive-Ins and Dives episodes
