= Dive! (restaurant) =

Former restaurant in Los Angeles, California

- Founded: May 11, 1994
- Founders: Steven Spielberg; Jeffrey Katzenberg
- Defunct: Early 2000s
- Headquarters: Los Angeles, California, United States

Dive! was a 300-seat restaurant, shaped like a neon-yellow submarine located in the Marketplace food court of the Century City Shopping Center, Los Angeles, California. It was owned by director Steven Spielberg and Disney Studios Chairman Jeffrey Katzenberg, and operated by Larry Levy, the Chairman of Levy Restaurants. The restaurant had a nautical theme to it, owing to Spielberg's love of undersea exploration. Dive! opened in May 1994, and was a popular hangout of celebrities until it closed in January 1999. A branch in Las Vegas opened in 1995, but would also close its doors by the early 2000s.

== See also ==
- List of defunct restaurants of the United States
