= Shaun Hergatt =

Australian chef

- Born: Shaun Hergatt; 1974 (age 51–52); Australia
- Culinary career
- Current restaurants
- AQUA, REN
- Previous restaurants
- SHO Shaun Hergatt, Juni, Vestry

Shaun Hergatt is a Michelin-starred Australian-born chef and restaurateur.

== Early career ==
Hergatt’s culinary career began at age 17 when he began a 4-year apprenticeship at Crystal Twig in Cairns, Australia studying french cuisine.

In 1997, he became Chef de Cuisine at the Dining Room at the Ritz-Carlton, Sydney. He was awarded “Best Young Chef” in 2000. Hergatt moved to the New York City’s Central Park location of the Ritz as Chef de Cuisine. The restaurant was awarded 3 stars by The New York Times and received a James Beard nomination for “Best New Restaurant”. In 2005, Hergatt became executive chef at The Setai Miami Beach, which was awarded “Best New Restaurant” from Esquire. In 2008 and 2009, the restaurant placed second in the world on Condé Nast Traveler’s “Gold List.”

== SHO Shaun Hergatt and Juni ==
In 2009, Hergatt moved back to New York to open his own restaurant, SHO Shaun Hergatt. The restaurant received one Michelin star in 2010 and 2011 and increased to 2 stars in 2012 as well as a rating of 29 out of 30 in Zagat. Esquire and New York Magazine awarded SHO “Best New Restaurant.” Hergatt left in 2012.

Hergatt opened Juni in 2013. It received a Michelin star in 2015 and 2016. The restaurant closed in 2016.

== Vestry ==
In October 2020, Hergatt opened Vestry in New York City. It received a Michelin star from 2021 until 2023. Vestry closed in September 2025.

== AQUA ==
In December 2021, Hergatt opened AQUA, a seafood lounge at Resorts World on the Las Vegas Strip.

== REN ==
In 2022, Hergatt opened his first wood-fired grill restaurant, REN in Brooklyn.
