= Young Joni =

Restaurant in Minneapolis, Minnesota, U.S.

- Interactive map of Young Joni

Restaurant information
- Closed: September 12, 2025
- Location: 165 13th Avenue NE, Minneapolis, Minnesota, 55413, United States
- Coordinates: 45°00′04″N 93°16′00″W
- Website: youngjoni.com

Young Joni was a restaurant in Minneapolis, Minnesota, United States.

== Description ==
In addition to pizza, the restaurant served small plates such as Korean sweet potatoes and charred savoy cabbage.

== History ==
Young Joni closed on September 12, 2025.

== Reception ==
The restaurant was included in The New York Times's 2024 list of the 22 best pizzerias in the U.S.

== See also ==
- List of defunct restaurants of the United States
