= Aldea (restaurant) =

Defunct restaurant in New York City

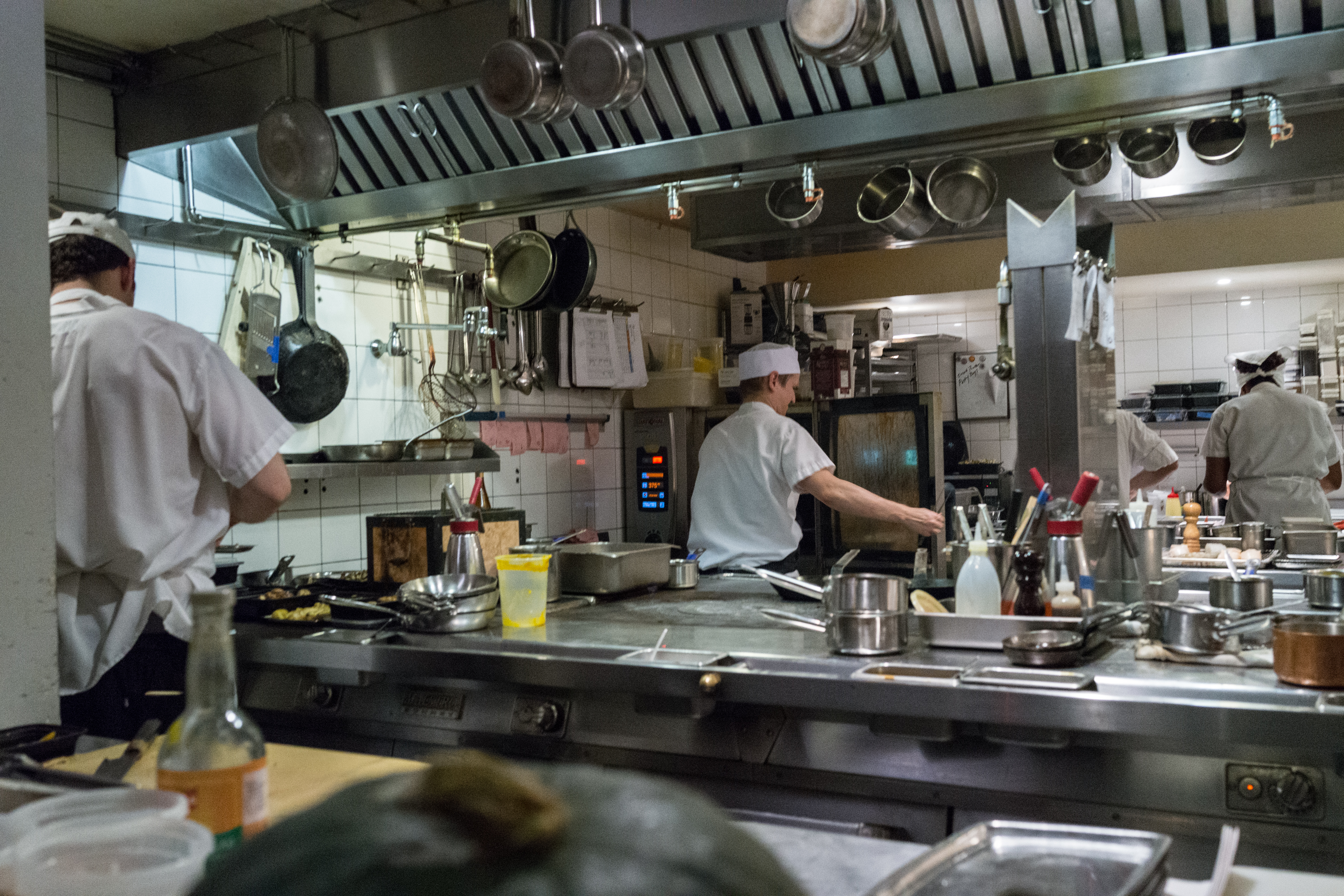
- Kitchen at Aldea as viewed from the dining room
- Interactive map of Aldea

Restaurant information
- Established: April 2009
- Closed: February 22, 2020
- Food type: Portuguese
- Location: 31 West 17th Street, New York City, New York, 10011, United States
- Coordinates: 40°44′19.5″N 73°59′37.8″W

Aldea was a restaurant in the Flatiron District of Manhattan in New York City. The fine dining establishment opened in 2009 and closed in 2020.

== Description ==
The restaurant occupied two stories and had an open kitchen so that diners could observe the preparation of food. It was decorated in a minimalist style with birch trees in its interior. Adam Platt of New York described the interior in 2009 as a "double-height, blond-wood-paneled space is set with chairs covered in plush white and blue leather, and a façade of white-striped glass filters the view of the outside world. The room is luminously lit and partitioned with sheets of more glass, which make it feel intimate and also worldly".

=== Menu ===
The restaurant served an eight-course tasting menu and a small à la carte menu. It was noted for combining elaborately presented dishes with more rustic, filling dishes. The restaurant's arroz de pato was often singled out as one of its best dishes. Mendes told Michelin Guide in 2019 that he was "a proponent of flavor versus appearance".

== History ==
Aldea opened in April 2009. The restaurant's head chef, George Mendes, is of Portuguese heritage, and the cuisine of Portugal heavily inspired the menu. Its name translates to "village" in Portuguese. It received a Michelin star in 2010, which it received every year following its operation.

Aldea closed after February 22, 2020, as Mendes planned to "take a break" and noted the difficulty in operating a restaurant in New York City at the time.

== See also ==
- List of defunct restaurants of the United States
- List of Michelin-starred restaurants in New York City
