= Moore's Delicatessen =

- Interactive map of Moore's Delicatessen

Restaurant information
- Established: October 2010
- Closed: August 31, 2020
- Location: 271 E Orange Grove Ave, Burbank, California, United States

Moore's Delicatessen, or Moore's Deli, was a restaurant located at 271 E Orange Grove Ave in Burbank, California. It served deli sandwiches, burgers, and other deli fare, along with breakfast foods, soups, and salads, as well as coffee and craft beer. The restaurant, located near Cartoon Network Studios, Nickelodeon Animation Studio, and Walt Disney Studios in Burbank, was known for its back dining room where animators, illustrators, and other artists from the aforementioned studios would draw on the walls.

Opened in 2010, Moore's Delicatessen became a location for local studio artists to eat, draw on the walls, and host watch parties. The restaurant closed over a month before its ten-year anniversary in 2020, following financial troubles resulting from the COVID-19 pandemic.

== History ==
Moore's Delicatessen opened in October 2010. It was owned by Robert Moore, a former executive chef at Dodger Stadium, and his wife Christine Moore. Robert Moore's grandparents had opened a delicatessen on San Francisco's Union Street in 1946.

=== The animation community ===
After the restaurant opened, Robert Moore observed many of his customers—animators, illustrators, and other artists from the nearby Cartoon Network Studios, Nickelodeon Animation Studio, and Walt Disney Studios in Burbank—drawing on napkins in the restaurant's back dining room. Moore bought them a bowl of Sharpies and suggested that they draw on the walls, and sign their drawings. The first drawing etched on one of the room's walls was of SpongeBob SquarePants holding a spatula, drawn by character designer Robert Ryan Cory. Other customers who drew on the wall included El Tigre: The Adventures of Manny Rivera creator Jorge Gutierrez and The Marvelous Misadventures of Flapjack creator Thurop Van Orman, who each added drawings of their respective shows' titular characters; SpongeBob SquarePants creator Stephen Hillenburg, who added a drawing of Patrick Star; writer Sean Szeles, who added a sketch of Mordecai from Regular Show; and Adventure Time creator Pendleton Ward, who added a drawing of Lumpy Space Princess.

By 2012, over 50 artists had covered the walls with illustrations of characters from properties such as Dora the Explorer, Family Guy, Futurama, Kung Fu Panda, Mickey Mouse, Monsters, Inc., The Simpsons, and Teenage Mutant Ninja Turtles.

The restaurant also hosted a number of watch parties. The first of these watch parties occurred in 2010, when storyboard artist Kent Osborne and his colleagues were searching for a location to watch the premiere of their show Adventure Time; Robert Moore suggested the restaurant, and they accepted. Aside from studio artists, fans would also attend watch parties and draw on the walls.

=== Closure ===
That's All Folks Thank you for 10 wonderful years. The Moore's Deli Family

— Moore's Deli announcing its closure on Facebook.

During the COVID-19 pandemic, despite attempts to transition to takeout, delivery, and patio dining, Moore's Delicatessen's business fell by 80%. Though the building's landlord offered to defer payments, the Moores could not afford to pay the restaurant's lease, and the restaurant closed on August 31, 2020. On social media, Robert Moore wrote "That's all folks" in an announcement of the restaurant's closure. Speaking to the Los Angeles Times, he stated: "I thought, 'what's the best way to do it?' And I thought about Porky Pig. He said, 'That's all, folks.' I think that was very appropriate to bid adieu to everybody in Burbank."

== In popular culture ==
- In the episode "TwiGH School Musical / Avenger Time" of the animated sketch comedy series Mad, Uatu the Watcher looks into the future and foresees "the crews of other cartoons sitting in a deli complaining about Mad like a bunch of sissies".
- The restaurant is featured in a scene in the 2015 film Uncle Kent 2.

== See also ==
- Impact of the COVID-19 pandemic on the restaurant industry in the United States
- List of defunct restaurants of the United States
