= Crush (restaurant) =

Defunct restaurant in Seattle, Washington, U.S.

- Interactive map of Crush

Restaurant information
- Location: 2319 East Madison Street, Seattle, King, Washington, 98112, United States
- Coordinates: 47°37′10″N 122°18′07″W

Crush was a restaurant in Seattle, in the U.S. state of Washington. It operated from 2005 to 2015.

The restaurant served American cuisine such as braised short ribs and seared scallops with baby leeks and porcini.

== See also ==
- List of defunct restaurants of the United States
