= Kajitsu =

Defunct Japanese restaurant in New York City, U.S.

- Interactive map of Kajitsu

Restaurant information
- Established: 2009
- Closed: September 18, 2022
- Food type: Japanese
- Location: 125 East 39th Street, New York City, New York, 10016, United States
- Coordinates: 40°44′59.4″N 73°58′40″W

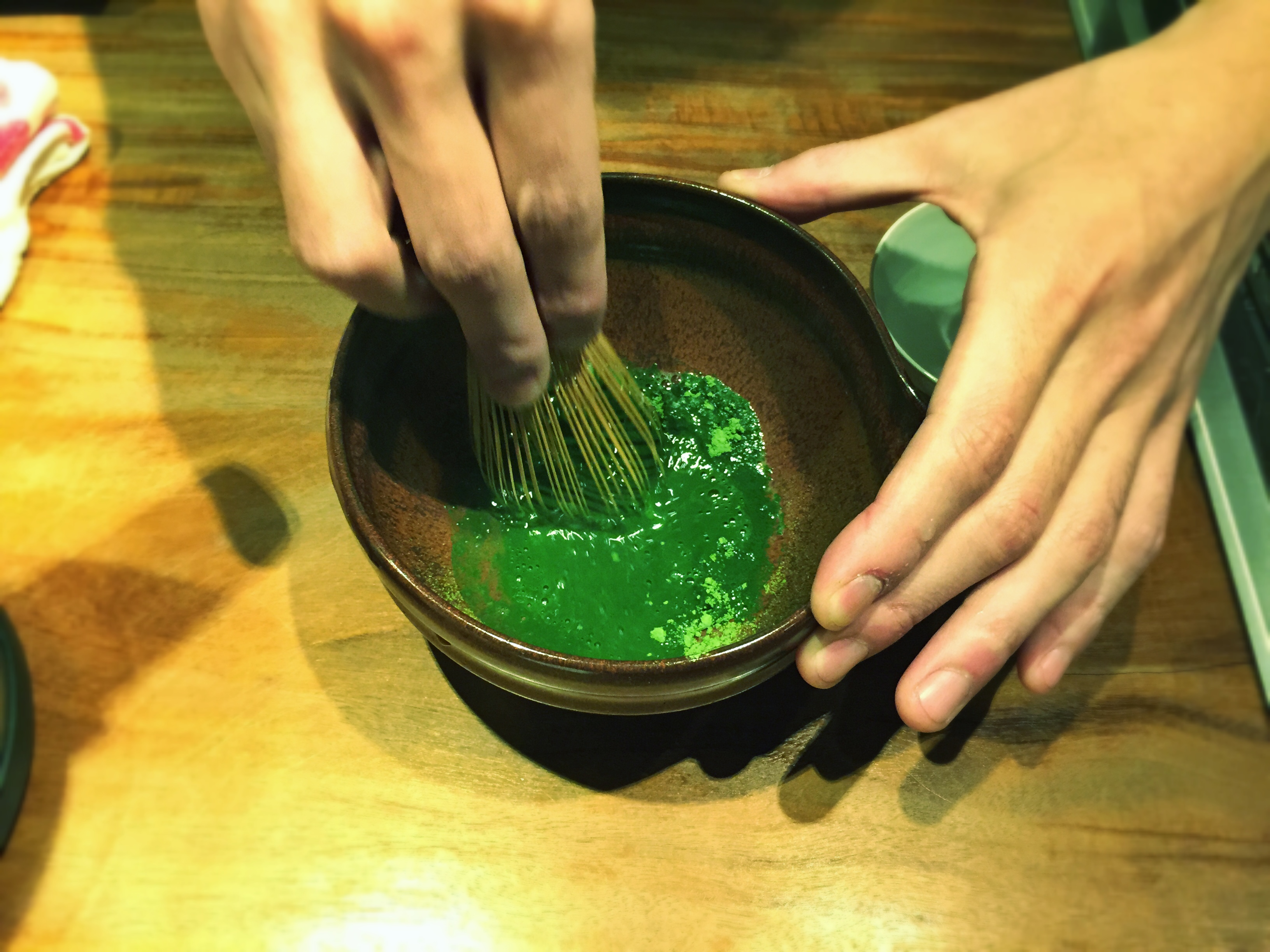
Matcha being stirred at Ippodo in 2014

Kajitsu was a Japanese restaurant in New York City. It specialized in shojin ryori or Japanese Buddhist cuisine serving seasonal vegetarian set menus. Along with the main restaurant, the owners also operated a non-vegetarian handmade soba space called Kokage downstairs as well as Kaijitsu Cafe for lunch options and wagashi. The space also hosted the only New York location of Ippodo, a tea place specializing in matcha which did full tea ceremonies as well as gyokuro and sencha. The restaurant had received a Michelin star. Time Out New York rated the restaurant four out of five stars. The restaurant opened at 414 East 9th Street in the East Village in 2009 and moved to 125 East 39th Street in Murray Hill in 2013.

The composer and musician Ryuichi Sakamoto was a regular diner at the restaurant, and was recognized for selecting the music played in the background at the restaurant.

== See also ==
- List of defunct restaurants of the United States
- List of Japanese restaurants
- List of Michelin-starred restaurants in New York City
