= Burbs Burgers =

Restaurant chain based in Seattle, Washington, U.S.

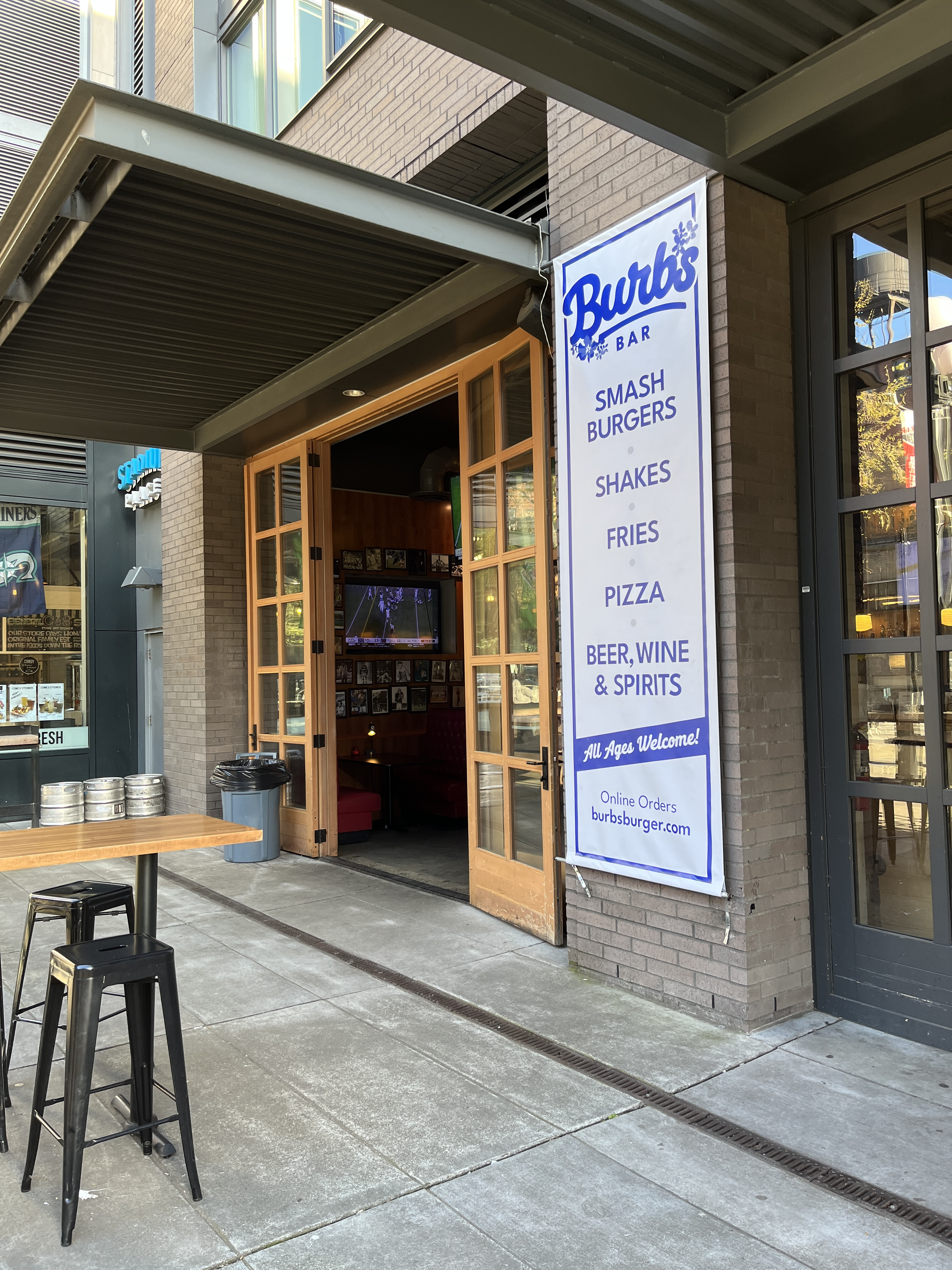
- Exterior of the Pioneer Square, Seattle location in 2023

Restaurant information
- Closed: February 2024
- Owner: Josh Henderson
- Chef: Josh Henderson
- Location: Washington, United States
- Website: burbsburger.com

Burbs Burgers was a small restaurant chain based in Seattle, in the U.S. state of Washington. Owned by Chef Josh Henderson, the business operated in the city's Montlake, Pioneer Square, and Ballard neighborhoods. All five locations closed in February 2024.

== Description ==
Burbs Burgers was a small restaurant chain based in Seattle. The business operated in the city's Montlake, Pioneer Square, and Ballard neighborhoods. The Montlake location was described as "a food truck, plus some fake grass and a couple pergolas for a seating area". The Pioneer Square location was described as a "faux grass-lined sports bar" with "old photos of sports heroes and trophies".

In addition to burgers, the menu included fried chicken sandwiches. The Burbs Classic was a burger with American cheese. The Burbs Special had pickles and "all the works".

== History ==
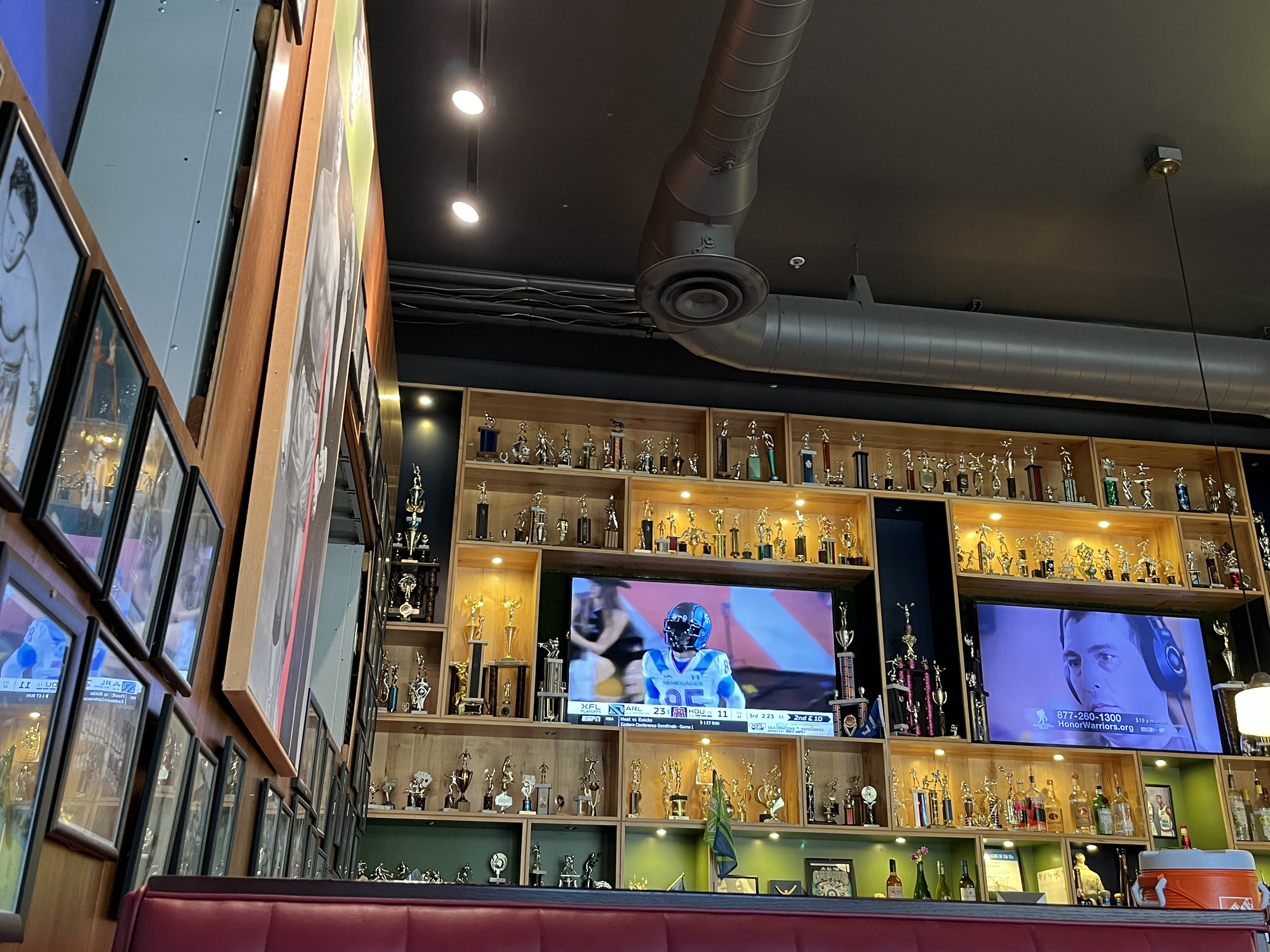
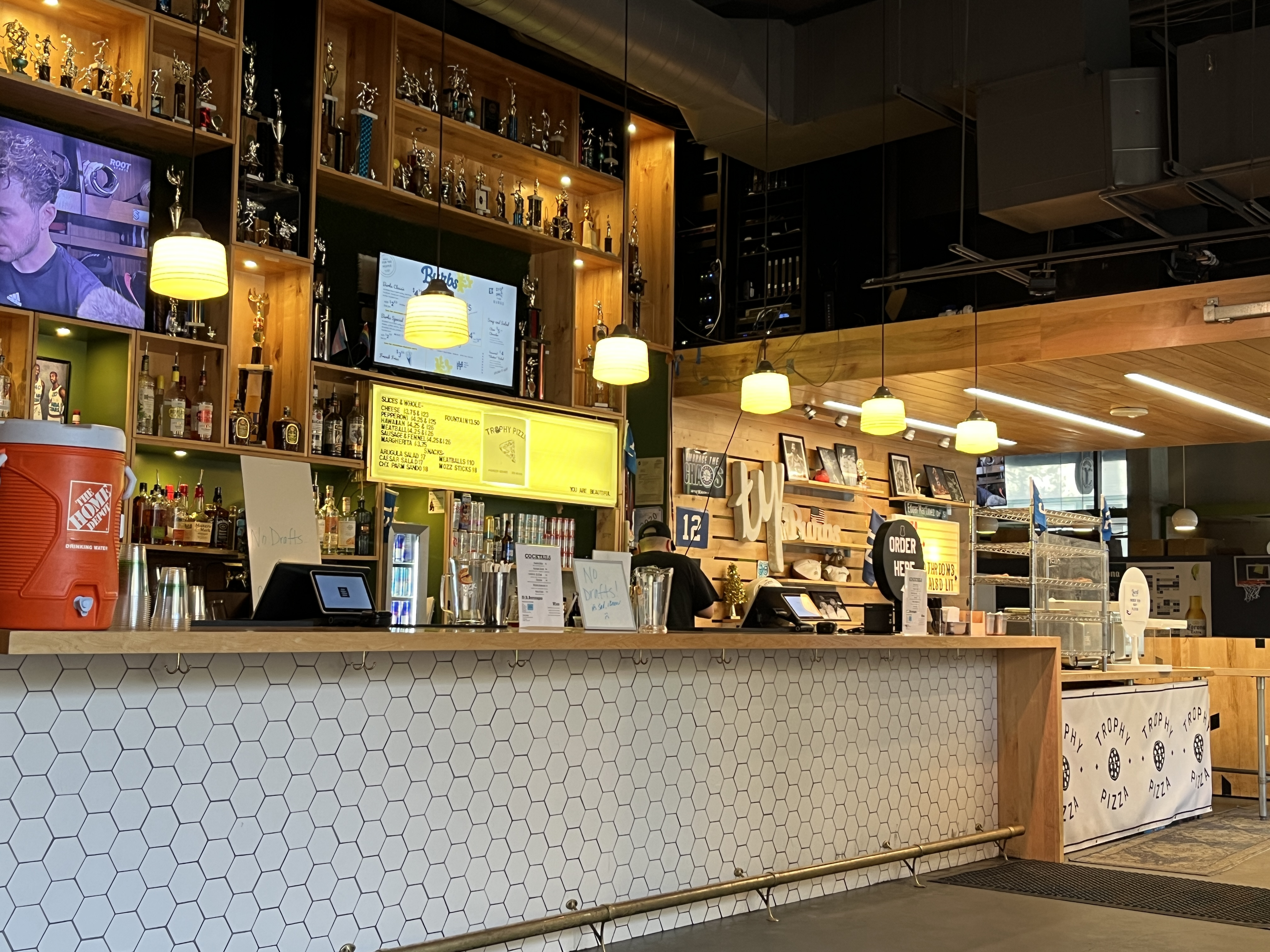
The interior of the Pioneer Square location (pictured in 2023), which shares a space with Trophy Pizza and displays photographs of sports players and trophies

Chef and owner Josh Henderson, who previously founded the restaurant chain Skillet, opened two Burbs Burgers locations during the COVID-19 pandemic, in Montlake and on King Street in a Pioneer Square building which had housed his sports bar Quality Athletics. The Montlake location opened on October 1, 2020.

During the pandemic, the Pioneer Square location shared a space with other businesses by Henderson: Trophy Pizza, and the pop-up restaurant Cookie's Country Chicken, which served fried chicken. The businesses operated via delivery and take-out at the time. David Gutman and Tan Vinh of The Seattle Times called Henderson "one of the city's most outspoken critics of the vaccination mandate". In February 2022, when Seattle announced plans to "lift its proof-of-vaccination requirement for restaurants, theaters and gyms" effective March 1, he called the policy change "long overdue".

In 2020–2021, Burbs Burgers announced plans to expand to the cities of Burien and Mountlake Terrace. The Burien location was originally slated to open in November 2020. The Mountlake Terrace location was slated to open at Cedar Plaza in 2020. Burbs Burgers operated at Great Notion Brewing in Ballard as of 2022.

In November 2023, Burbs Burgers filed for Chapter 11 bankruptcy. The company had planned to expand the Burbs Burgers' name to other parts around the Seattle area post-bankruptcy. However, all five of its locations closed in February 2024.

== Reception ==
Tan Vinh included the cheeseburger in The Seattle Times' 2021 list of "5 best dishes our food critic ate in the Seattle area this month for under $10" and wrote, "This is one of the cheapest smashed burgers around town, and it's as good as many higher-priced versions." Vinh also included Burbs Burgers in a list of the "20 best dishes of 2021", as determined by the newspaper's food critics. Vin recommended the smash burger "for a taste reminiscent of a Big Mac, but without the middle bun. Better, though, is the double cheeseburger with none of the add-ons for a cleaner, beefy bite". Allecia Vermillion of Seattle Metropolitan included Burbs Burgers in a 2023 list of the best eateries near Lumen Field and T-Mobile Park.

Zuri Anderson included the Ballard location in iHeartMedia's 2022 list of Seattle's five best burger restaurants, based on Yelp reviews. Kayla Sager-Riley of The Infatuation called the Pioneer Square restaurant "a fine burger savior after hitting every beer garden in T-Mobile Park or hocking family heirlooms to attend a Beyoncé concert at Lumen Field", and said the location served "just-OK burgers and sometimes-soggy buns". Sager-Riley and Aimee Rizzo also included the business in a 2023 overview of "where to eat near T-Mobile Park and Lumen Field".

== See also ==
- List of defunct restaurants of the United States
- List of hamburger restaurants
