= Animal (restaurant) =

Defunct restaurant in Los Angeles, California, U.S.

- Interactive map of Animal

Restaurant information
- Established: 2008
- Location: 435 North Fairfax Avenue, Los Angeles, California, United States
- Coordinates: 34°04′45″N 118°21′42″W
- Seating capacity: 50

Animal was a restaurant in Los Angeles, California, United States.

Vinny Dotolo and Jon Shook opened the 50-seat restaurant in 2008. It closed after the arrival of the COVID-19 pandemic. It reopened in 2022, before closing again in 2023.

== See also ==
- List of defunct restaurants of the United States
