= The Fat Cow =

Restaurant information
- Established: 1 October 2012; 14 years ago
- Closed: 27 March 2014; 12 years ago
- Chef: Gordon Ramsay
- Location: 189 The Grove Drive, Los Angeles, CA 90036, United States

The Fat Cow was a restaurant owned and run by chef Gordon Ramsay and his business partner, Rowen Seibel. It opened in 2012 at The Grove shopping centre in Los Angeles, and after a series of legal challenges, it closed permanently in 2014. The menu was described by Ramsay as one you might expect to find in a "neighborhood restaurant."

== History ==
Scottish chef Gordon Ramsay trademarked the name "The Fat Cow" in the UK in 2011, leading to speculation that he was about to open a chain of mid-priced steak and barbecue restaurants. Prior to its opening in the United States, it was publicised as partially following this concept with Ramsay describing it as "a place where people can just relax and enjoy a delicious European inspired meal".

The Fat Cow opened on 1 October 2012, located in The Grove shopping centre in Los Angeles as a joint venture between Ramsay and his business partner Rowen Seibel. The head chef at the time of opening was Mathew Woolf, while Andi Van Willigan was involved in setting up the restaurant as part of her position as Gordon Ramsay Holdings Corporate Executive U.S. Chef. It marked the second time that Ramsay had opened a restaurant in Los Angeles after Gordon Ramsay at The London. The restaurant was fitted out with communal tables, and decorated with reclaimed wood and unfinished metal. The design was created by Interior Design firm AK DESIGN NETWORK.

A year after opening, Ramsay was sued by the contractors he used to fit out the restaurant over an unpaid bill of $45,350.35 out of $191,235.24. A few months later a class action lawsuit was brought by the employees of the restaurant over his failure to pay minimum wage, give sufficient breaks, and pay overtime.

The restaurant was closed on 27 March 2014, amid a legal dispute over the name. The owner of a Spanish restaurant in Florida, Las Vacas Gordas, was said to have exclusive use of the name, and required Ramsay's Fat Cow to be closed or renamed. Following the closure, Seibel launched a legal claim against Ramsay for $10 million, saying that the chef had attempted to close the restaurant down and re-open it under a new name with the original staff in an effort to cut him out of the deal. It was claimed that Ramsay had known about the trademark issue since opening the restaurant, and had intended to rename it to GR Roast.

In addition, the landlord of The Grove shopping centre launched an action against Ramsay for $6 million in unpaid rent on a long-term lease of $52,000 a month. Ramsay's representatives issued a statement to the press over the rent issue, saying that "It's the unfortunate, but inevitable normal procedure following the closure of a restaurant."

== Menu ==
The menu was intended to be more casual than some of Ramsay's other restaurants. He said that "The concept for The Fat Cow came from my desire to have a neighborhood restaurant that you could go to all the time to just relax and enjoy a terrific meal". Ingredients were to be sourced seasonally and using the farmers' market next door to the restaurant. Dishes included salads, pizzas cooked in a wood-fired oven, a Kobe beef burger, and lobster macaroni and cheese. There was also a separate ice-cream bar, serving soft-serve and ice-cream sandwiches.

== Reception ==
Besha Rodell in the LA Weekly was disappointed with the food on offer at The Fat Cow, saying that her fries were "tepid" and that the Kobe burger "tasted no more special than any pub burger anywhere in America". She was more impressed by a couple of dishes: a salmon with celeriac coleslaw and a pizza with burrata and sausage, but she criticized Ramsay for trading on his name, and summed it up by saying that

What galls is the act of misleading those folks, the people who are curious about all the hype given to food these days, who might decide to put themselves into Ramsay's hands to help them figure it out. The hoodwinking of those customers is the real reason this restaurant is more offensive than the sum of its not-very-good parts.

The Zagat guide said that it was an "easy date-night pick" and graded it 18 for food, 17 for decor and 17 for service, each out of 30.

== See also ==
- List of defunct restaurants of the United States
