= Curtis Duffy =

American chef

Curtis Duffy is an American chef and restaurateur known for the Chicago-based restaurants Ever and Grace. Among his various accolades are Michelin stars and a James Beard Award.

== Early life and education ==
Duffy was born in Newark, Ohio in 1975, from Robert and Jan Duffy, who were eighteen years old. He lived in Colorado Springs, Colorado until age 12, when his family moved to Johnstown, Ohio. When Duffy was 19, his estranged father killed his wife and then himself in a murder-suicide in 1994.

== Professional career ==
Duffy began his career as a professional chef in 2000 working under the namesake restaurant of chef Charlie Trotter in Chicago. In 2003, Duffy worked as pastry chef with Grant Achatz at Trio in Evanston, IL. Duffy left Trio with Achatz to serve as Chef de cuisine at Alinea in Chicago in 2005. Duffy became head chef at Avenues, a restaurant in the Peninsula Hotel Chicago in 2009. Avenues earned two Michelin stars in 2010. Duffy and Michael Muser opened Grace in Chicago's West Loop in December 2012. In 2013, the Robb Report named Grace the best restaurant in the world. Grace earned three stars in the Michelin Guide four years in a row starting in 2015 and closed in December 2017.

In July 2020, Duffy and Muser opened Ever restaurant, which was awarded two Michelin stars in 2021, 2022, and 2023. Duffy launched Reve Burger in December of 2020 during the indoor dining shutdown during the COVID-19 pandemic. Reve closed in July 2022. In 2022, Duffy opened After lounge, and the following year Esquire named After one of the Best Bars in America.

== In media ==
Duffy appeared as a judge for four seasons (2011–2014) on the Chicago Restaurant Pastry Competition reality TV show. The 2015 Netflix documentary For Grace centers on Duffy and his journey to becoming a three-Michelin-starred chef. In 2018 Duffy appeared as a guest judge in the season finale of Top Chef: Colorado. Duffy appeared in Netflix's Iron Chef: Quest for an Iron Legend in 2022 and as a judge on Season 21 of Top Chef. In 2023, season 2, episode 7 of The Bear was filmed inside Ever. Duffy made and plated the dishes that appear in the episode. In 2024, the season 3 finale of The Bear was filmed inside Ever. In 2026, Aphotic Media released Ever After, a documentary film directed by Frankie Nasso and written by Jeremy Wagner that premiered at the Chicago International Film Festival.

== Personal life ==
Duffy is married to Jennifer Duffy. He has two daughters and two stepchildren.

== Awards and accolades ==
The James Beard Foundation named Duffy Best Chef, Great Lakes in 2016. Duffy was inducted into the Disciples d'Escoffier in 2016
