= Coastal Kitchen =

Restaurant in Seattle, Washington, U.S.

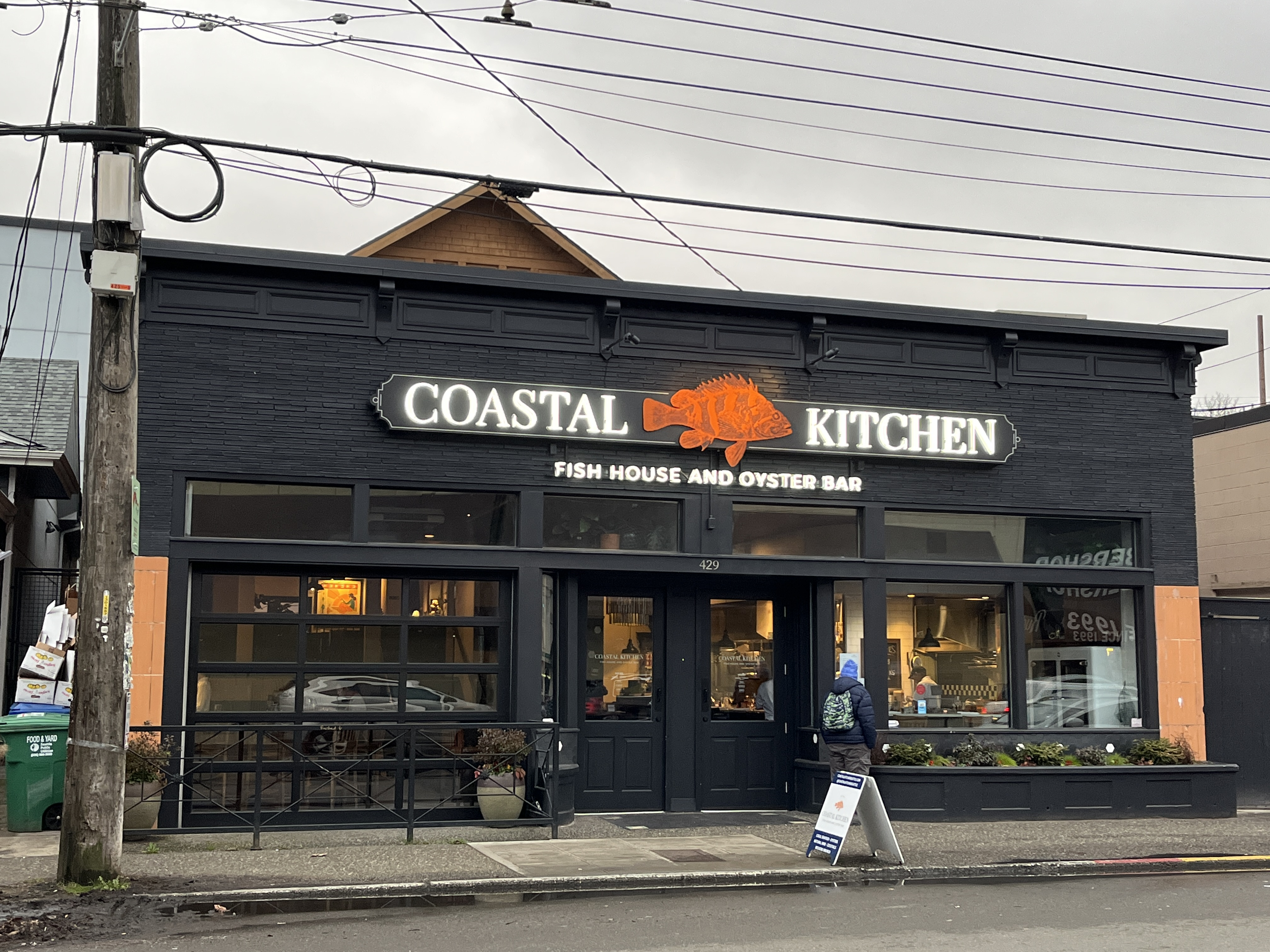
- The restaurant's exterior, 2023
- Interactive map of Coastal Kitchen

Restaurant information
- Established: 1993
- Closed: February 2024
- Food type: New American; seafood
- Location: 429 15th Avenue E, Seattle, King, Washington, 98112, United States
- Coordinates: 47.6228°N 122.3130°W
- Website: coastalkitchenseattle.com

Coastal Kitchen was a restaurant on Seattle's Capitol Hill, in the U.S. state of Washington. It closed in late February 2024.

== Description ==
Coastal Kitchen was a New American and seafood restaurant with a rotating menu on Capitol Hill. According to Sunset magazine, "The regional lunch and dinner menus at this Capitol Hill cafe change[d] often, shifting from foods of Gascony one quarter to Indian or Patagonian cuisine the next, and the eclectic art on the walls change[d] as often as the menu." Thrillist described Coastal Kitchen as a "classic fish house and oyster bar" serving chowder, crab cakes, jambalaya with smoked salmon, and shrimp ceviche. The restaurant was also described as "family-friendly" and "hip". Fodor's called Coastal Kitchen "chic yet casual". The menu included albacore and yellowfin tuna, calamari, cod, clams, fish and chips, oysters, pasta with sardines, a smoked salmon scramble, Dungeness crab cake benedict, gingerbread waffles, and huevos rancheros. The Cuban Pete's Shipwreck was described as "a loose interpretation of paella with plump mussels and clams, chorizo and soft sweet peppers". The restaurant also served poutine, spring rolls, fried green tomatoes, and stew.

== History ==
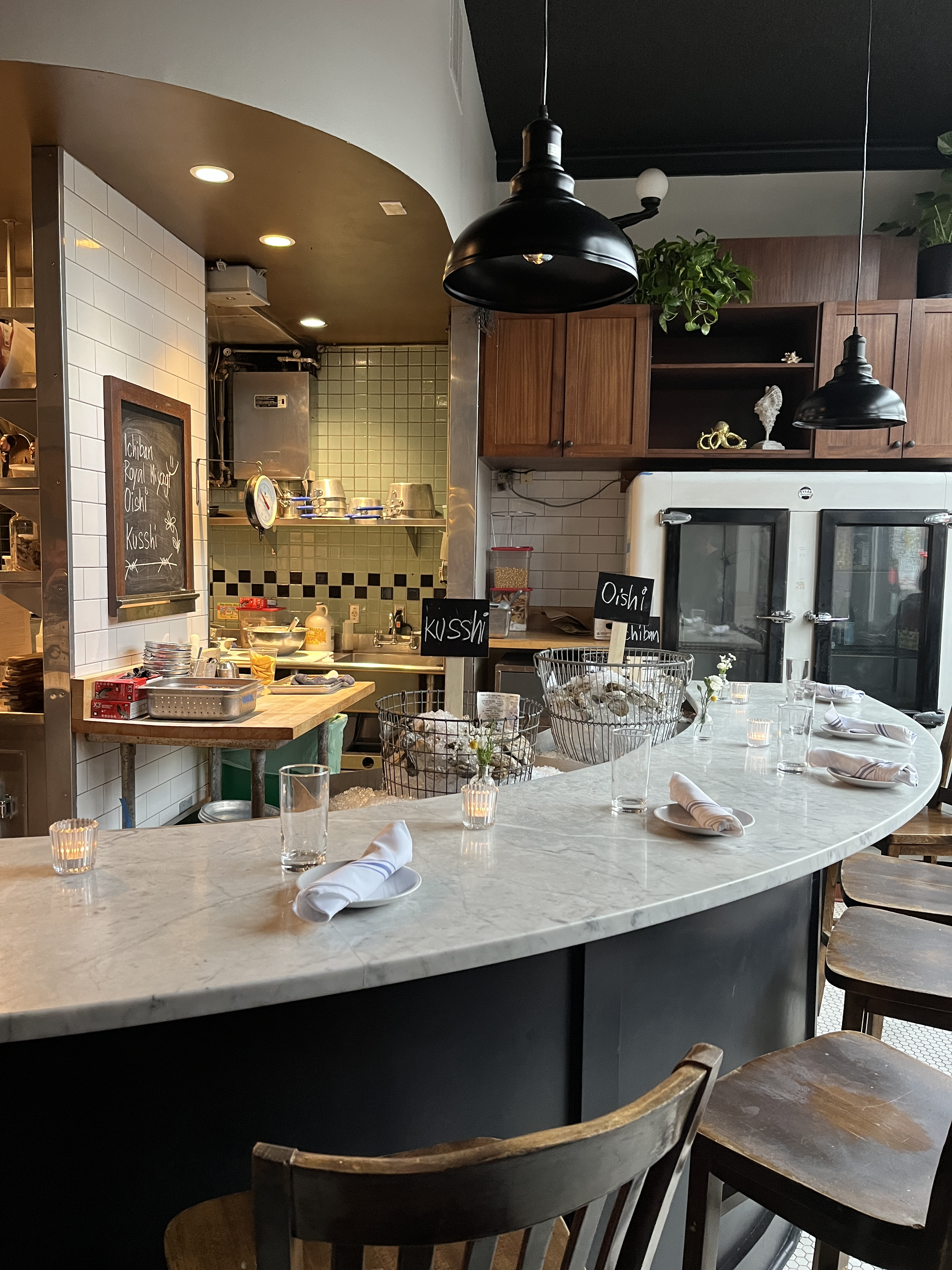
Interior, 2022

Jeremy and Tiah Hardy opened Coastal Kitchen in 1993.

The restaurant received an approximately $350,000 remodel in 2012, during which owner Jeremy Hardy closed the restaurant for a month. To commemorate the re-opening the business hosted an inaugural First Shuck and gave away 1,000 oysters at no cost. Seattle Weekly said, "When the dust settled, most noticeable of the changes was a gleaming, marble-topped oyster bar that curves around the open kitchen where the cocktail bar once was."

Zephyr Paquette was head chef as of 2015. Dan and Jonathan Tweten purchased the business in 2016. In 2022, a driver ran a vehicle into the front of the restaurant, causing structural damage. The restaurant closed permanently in late February 2024.

== Reception ==
In Seattle (1998), Bill and W. C. McRae said the restaurant "serves up some of the best food in the neighborhood". In Hidden Washington (2005), Eric Lucas said Coastal Kitchen "has no trouble maintaining a loyal clientele". In 2015, Deborah Wang of NPR called the restaurant "a fixture of Seattle's Capitol Hill neighborhood for 20 years". Time Out included Coastal Kitchen in a 2015 list of the best breakfast restaurants in the United States.

== See also ==
- List of defunct restaurants of the United States
- List of New American restaurants
- List of oyster bars
- List of seafood restaurants
