= Avenues (restaurant) =

Defunct restaurant in Chicago, Illinois, U.S.

- Interactive map of Avenues

Restaurant information
- Head chef: Curtis Duffy
- Rating: Michelin Guide
- Location: 108 East Superior Street, Chicago, Illinois, 60611, United States
- Coordinates: 41°53′45.5″N 87°37′30.5″W

Avenues was the fine-dining restaurant at the Peninsula Chicago in Chicago, Illinois. Curtis Duffy served as its chef de cuisine from 2008 until his departure in 2011, after which the hotel planned to close and reconceive the restaurant. In November 2010, it was one of three Chicago restaurants awarded two Michelin stars when the guide first covered the city. Avenues closed later in 2011.

== See also ==
- List of defunct restaurants of the United States
- List of Michelin-starred restaurants in Chicago
