= Barrio (restaurant) =

Defunct Mexican restaurant in Seattle, Washington, U.S.

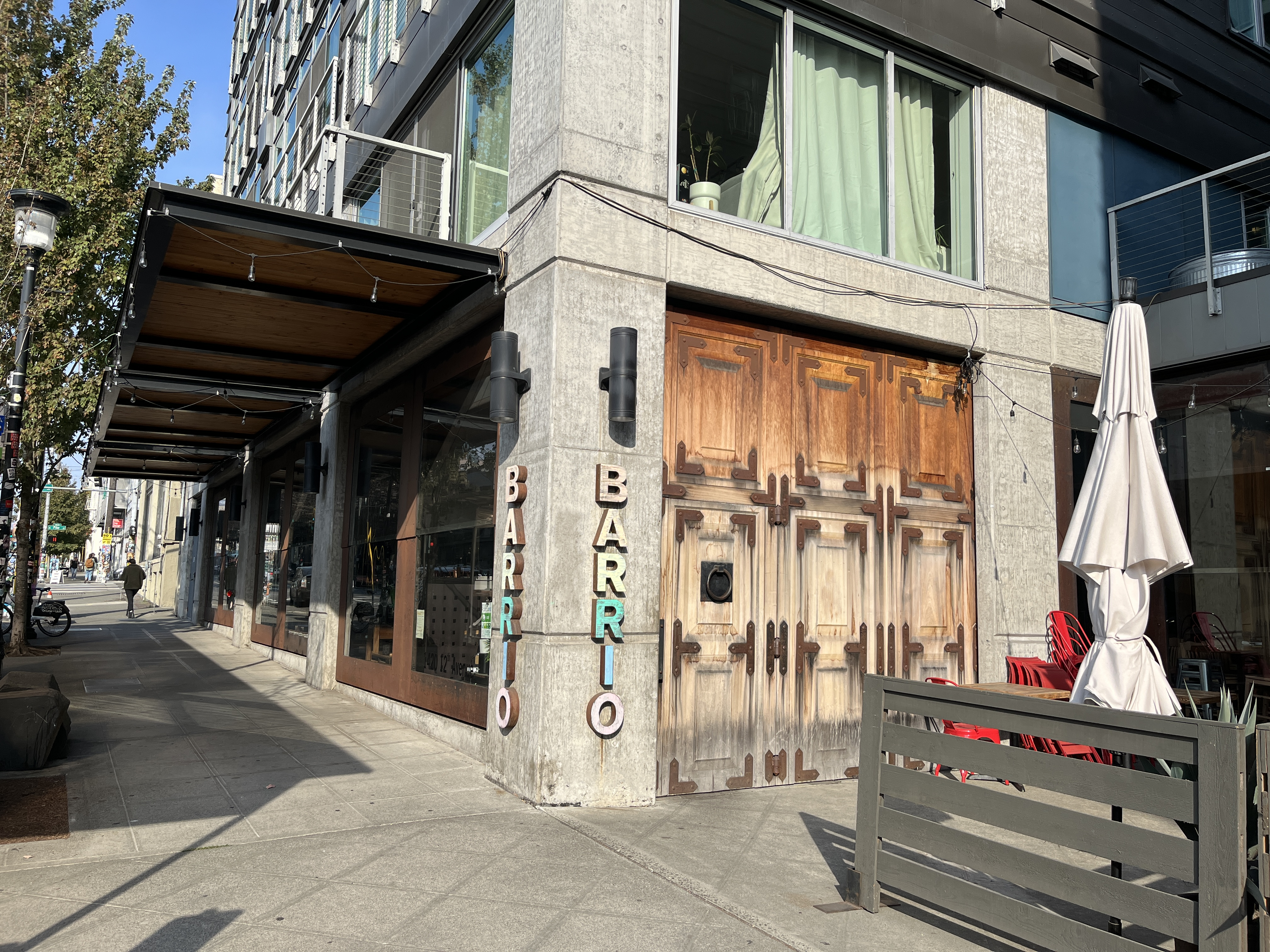
- The restaurant's exterior, 2022
- Interactive map of Barrio

Restaurant information
- Closed: 2024
- Owner: Heavy Restaurant Group
- Food type: Mexican
- Location: 1420 12th Avenue, Seattle, King, Washington, 98122, United States
- Coordinates: 47.6137°N 122.3166°W
- Website: barriorestaurant.com

Barrio Mexican Kitchen & Bar, or simply Barrio, was a Mexican restaurant in Seattle, in the U.S state of Washington. The restaurant was owned by Heavy Restaurant Group, which previously operated a second Barrio location in Bellevue. It closed permanently in 2024.

== Description ==
Barrio was Mexican restaurant on Capitol Hill. Thrillist said the business served agave and had "a modern approach to Mexican cuisine that's inspired by Pacific Northwestern flavors and seasonal ingredients -- from freshly caught seafood and locally sourced beef to wild mushrooms and vegan cheeses". In 2014, Sara Billups of Eater Seattle described Barrio as a "stylish Capitol Hill Mexican spot". In 2015, the website's Megan Hill said the restaurant had a "slightly upscale twist on Mexican flavors".

The brunch menu included carnitas and pancakes, pork belly benedict, burritos, and tacos. The happy hour menu included the Triple T special, which had a taco, a can of Tecate, and tequila. The drink menu also included beer, mezcal, a prickly pear Bellini, and a Bloody Mary. Margarita varieties included blood orange, a reposado infused with ghost pepper, and a blanco tequila with tamarind.

== History ==
The restaurant was operated by Heavy Restaurant Group (also known as Heavy Restaurants). In addition to the Capitol Hill location, the company operated a Barrio restaurant in Bellevue for approximately two years, until closing in 2011. Plans were to convert the Bellevue restaurant into an event space, and 75 percent of workers there were "reassigned" to other Heavy restaurants.

In 2022, nine restaurant workers walked out in protest of the tipping structure. The restaurant closed permanently in August 2024.

Pablo y Pablo has been described as a sibling restaurant, with locations Kirkland, Leschi, and Wallingford. Barrio was replaced by Mint and Martini.

== Reception ==
Thrillist said the restaurant offered "around the clock hours (read: brunch through late-night service, every weekend), central location, and extensive outdoor seating area that keep locals and visitors sufficiently sated by tacos and tequila. It's what mezcal dreams are made of, morning, noon, and night." In 2013, Eater Seattle readers voted to include Barrio in a list of eighteen "best under the radar" brunches. Sara Billups included the restaurant in the website's 2014 list of fifteen happy hours in Seattle to try. In 2015, Perry recommended Barrio in Eater Seattle's list of twenty bars in the city for mourning the Super Bowl loss. The website's Gabe Guarente included the restaurant in a 2019 list of eight "super cool" Seattle eateries for margaritas.

== See also ==
- List of defunct restaurants of the United States
- List of Mexican restaurants
