= Juni (restaurant) =

Defunct restaurant in New York City, U.S.

- Interactive map of Juni

Restaurant information
- Head chef: Shaun Hergatt
- Location: 12 East 31st Street, New York City, New York, 10016, United States
- Coordinates: 40°44′45.9″N 73°59′6.7″W

Juni was a restaurant in New York City. The restaurant operated from 2013 to 2016, and had received a Michelin star.

== See also ==
- List of defunct restaurants of the United States
- List of Michelin-starred restaurants in New York City
