= Omega Ouzeri =

Greek restaurant in Seattle, Washington, U.S.

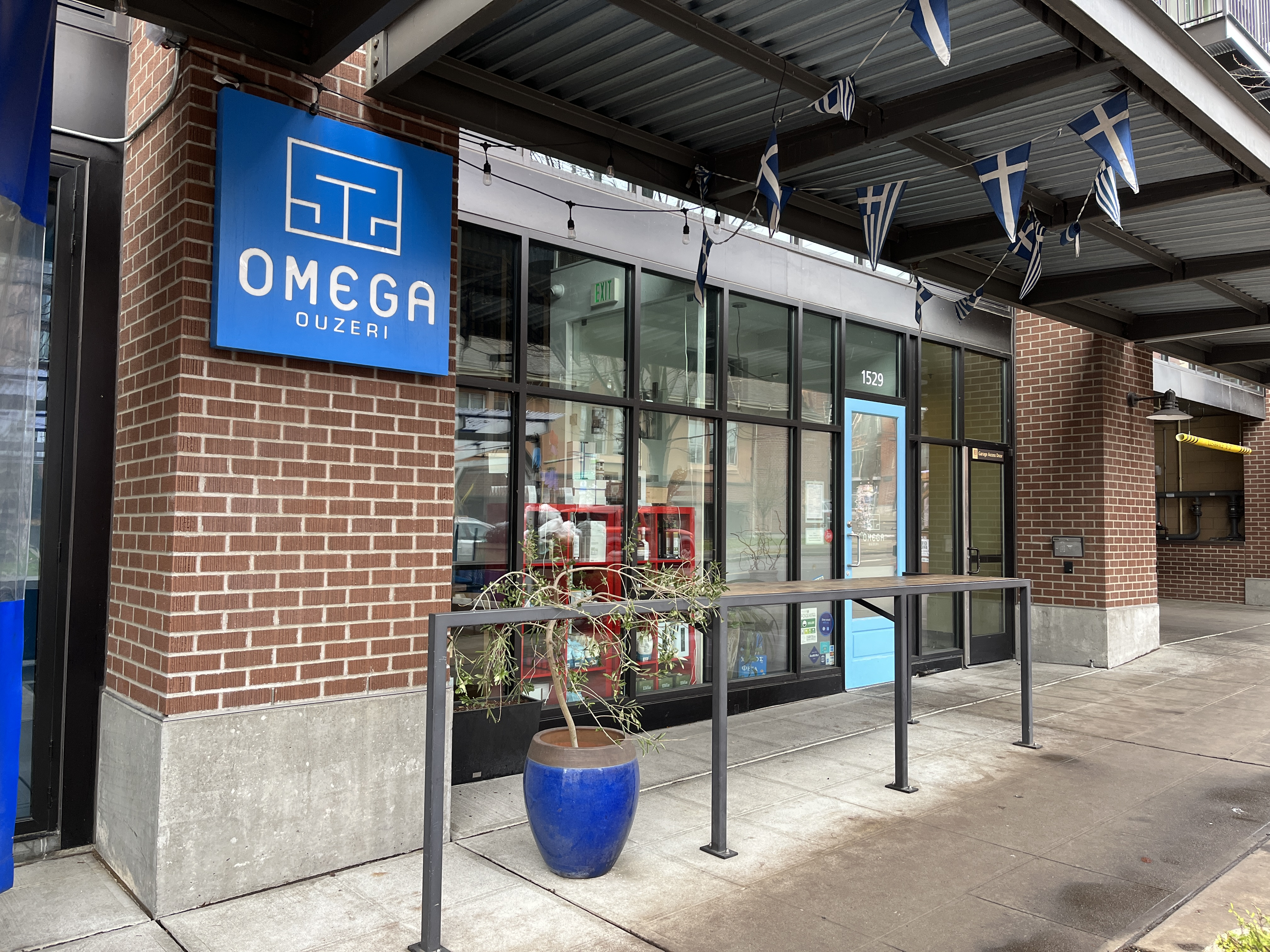
- The restaurant's exterior, 2022
- Interactive map of Omega Ouzeri

Restaurant information
- Established: January 2015
- Closed: January 31, 2024
- Owner: Thomas Soukakos
- Chef: Thomas Soukakos
- Food type: Greek
- Location: 1529 14th Avenue, Seattle, King, Washington, 98122, United States
- Coordinates: 47.6149°N 122.3144°W
- Website: omegaouzeri.com

Omega Ouzeri was a Greek restaurant and bar on Seattle's Capitol Hill, in the U.S. state of Washington. The restaurant closed permanently on January 31, 2024.

== Description ==
The Greek restaurant Omega Ouzeri was located on Capitol Hill. The interior had a white and blue color scheme and the flag of Greece was displayed on the exterior. The restaurant served grilled octopus, sea bass, lamb shoulder stifado with Sifnian chickpeas, and oysters in rosé vinegar and shallot mignonette. The brunch menu included bougatsa, meze, gyros, and a pork belly benedict with harissa hollandaise sauce.

For New Year's Eve in 2019, the restaurant offered a four-course meal with meze platters as well as feta fondu, octopus, poached grouper, pan-seared duck breast, and vegetarian moussaka as options. For Easter in 2021, during the COVID-19 pandemic, the restaurant offered take-out meals with pita and dips, lamb shoulder with lemon roasted potatoes, spanakopita, beet salad, and rice pudding or baklava.

Lonely Planet says, "In an unassuming, square brick building, Omega Ouzeri's doors open to a bright, airy restaurant, pristine in white and baby blue, with metallic and marble accents throughout. Omega celebrates ouzo (a traditional anise-flavored aperitif), and its dishes range from gigantes (braised butter beans) to octapodi (grilled octopus) and are prepared thoughtfully and beautifully." According to KING-TV's Ellen Meny, the restaurant has "one of the largest Greek wine lists on the West Coast, as well as a wide variety of ouzo".

== History ==
Thomas Soukakos opened the restaurant in January 2015. Zoi Antonitsas became chef later in the year.

The restaurant closed permanently on January 31, 2024.

== Reception ==
Thrillist says, "This Capitol Hill Greek spot does a fairly good impression of Greek island life, serving up small plates to the tune of fried Greek potatoes and roasted cauliflower with taramosalata. Casual and filled with conversation background noise, the brightly lit space is ideal for date night -- with a significant other, or your appetite." Omega topped The National Herald's 2022 list of the top ten Greek restaurants in the United States. Gabe Guarente, Mark Van Streefkerk, and Jade Yamazaki Stewart included Omega in Eater Seattle's 2022 overview of 25 "essential" Capitol Hill restaurants.

== See also ==
- List of defunct restaurants of the United States
- List of Greek restaurants
