= Eight Row =

Restaurant in Seattle, Washington, U.S.

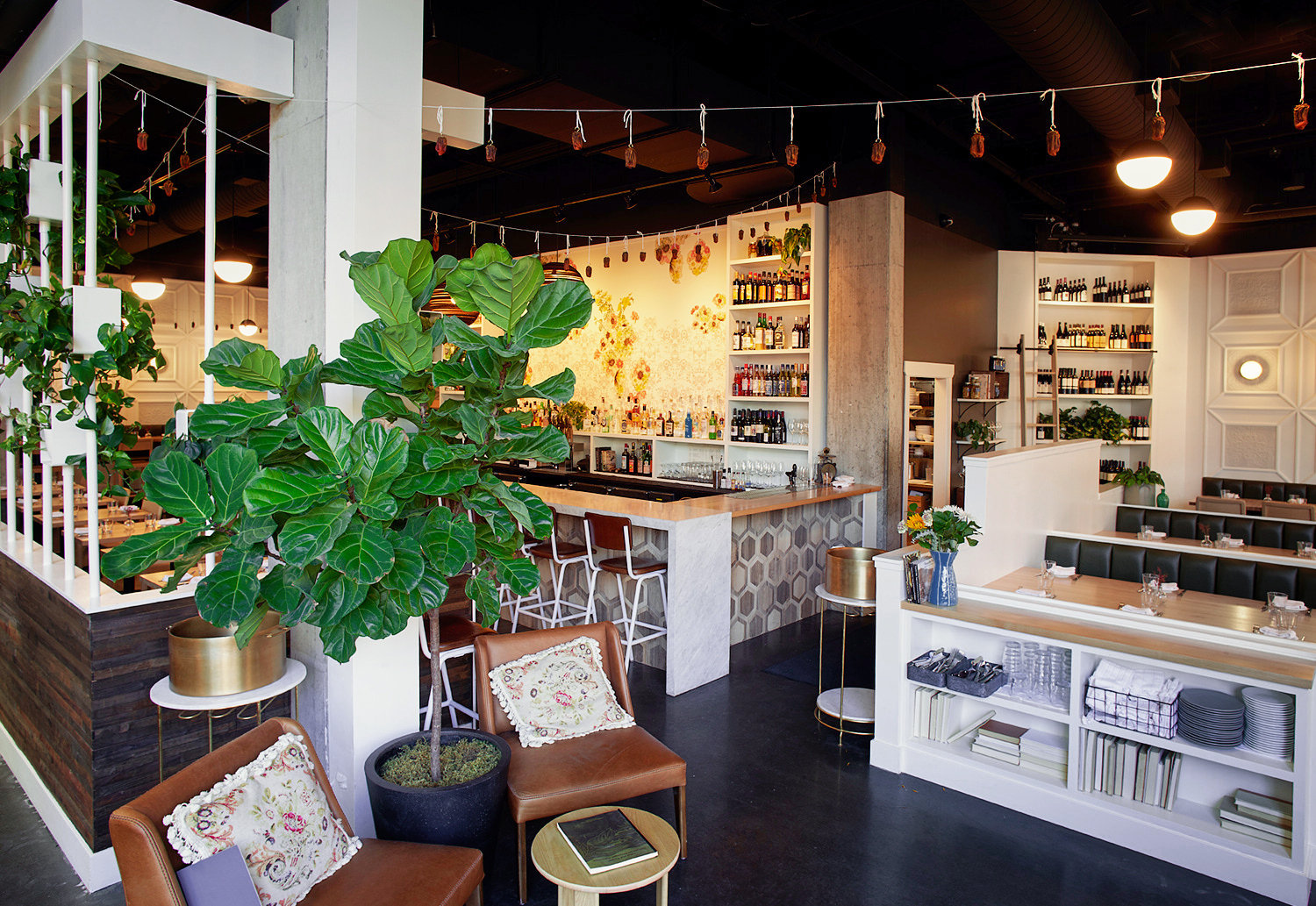
- The restaurant's interior
- Interactive map of Eight Row

Restaurant information
- Established: 2019
- Closed: 2024
- Owners: David and Ian Nichols
- Head chef: David Nichols
- Food type: American
- Location: 7102 Woodlawn Avenue NE, Seattle, King, Washington, 98115, United States
- Coordinates: 47°40′49″N 122°19′28″W
- Website: www.eightrow.com

Eight Row was a restaurant in Seattle, in the U.S. state of Washington. Established in 2019, the restaurant served American cuisine. It closed in 2024.

== Reception ==
In 2022 and 2023, executive chef David Nichols was nominated in the Best Chef: Northwest and Pacific category by the James Beard Foundation Awards. In 2024, Eight Row was nominated in the Outstanding Wine and Beverage Program category.

== See also ==
- List of defunct restaurants of the United States
