= The Linkery =

Restaurant in California, U.S.

Coordinates: 32°44′50″N 117°7′49″W

- Industry: Restaurant
- Founder: Jay Porter
- Defunct: July 15, 2013
- Headquarters: San Diego, California
- Products: natural meat, local food, fine wines, craft beer, and cask ale
- Website: https://web.archive.org/web/20140328174758/http://thelinkery.com/blog/

The Linkery was a farm-to-table restaurant in North Park, San Diego, California that specialized in natural meat, local food, fine wines, craft beer, and cask ale. The restaurant's name referred to its daily-changing offerings of house-made sausages.

The Linkery was founded in 2005 by Jay Porter, a former engineer and consultant for consumer electronics companies with no prior restaurant experience. Porter was responsible for the restaurant's strict fixed-tipping policy, which angered other nearby establishments.

Linkery's philosophy was based in part on the premise that "eating is an agricultural act," proposed by Wendell Berry in The Pleasures of Eating.

As of July 15, 2013, The Linkery closed, and the location was re-sold to another company.

== Recognition ==
The Linkery was named one of the 100 best farm-to-table restaurants in America by Gourmet Magazine (Oct 2007). It was also featured as one of the 100 best places to drink beer in America by Imbibe Magazine (September 2008).

In March 2010, the San Diego City Attorney's office contacted the Linkery's owner claiming that the restaurant violated California Business and Professions Code Section 12024.2 for unfair competition and making untrue or misleading representations about pricing. It was the owner's practice to charge an additional 18% of the price of the total bill.

== See also ==
- List of defunct restaurants of the United States
