= Briazz =

Defunct American sandwich restaurant chain

- Type: Chain restaurant
- Industry: Food service
- Founded: 1995
- Defunct: 2005
- Fate: Filed for Chapter 11 bankruptcy in 2004; assets purchased by Organic To Go in 2005.
- Successor: Organic To Go
- Headquarters: Seattle, Washington, U.S.
- Area served: Seattle, Chicago, San Francisco, Los Angeles
- Products: Sandwiches

Briazz was a Seattle based sandwich restaurant chain founded in 1995. At one time, its stores reached across America as far as Chicago, San Francisco, and Los Angeles.

In June 2004, Briazz filed for Chapter 11 bankruptcy protection. Then in April 2005, Organic To Go won an auction to buy most of Briazz's assets for $1.35 million. Organic To Go was to replace the Briazz brand with its own at 12 out of the 15 existing Briazz locations.
