= Tulsi (restaurant) =

Defunct restaurant in New York City, U.S.

- Interactive map of Tulsi

Restaurant information
- Established: 2011
- Food type: Indian
- Location: 211 East 46th Street, New York City, New York, 10017, United States
- Coordinates: 40°45′11.5″N 73°58′19″W

Tulsi was an Indian restaurant in Manhattan, New York City. The restaurant had received a Michelin star.

== See also ==
- List of defunct restaurants of the United States
- List of Indian restaurants
- List of Michelin-starred restaurants in New York City
