= Velvet Turtle =

Former restaurant chain

Velvet Turtle was a chain of fine-dining restaurants founded by Wally Botello based in Menlo Park, California, that at its height had 20 locations in California, plus one location each in Washington state, and Arizona.

== History ==
In 1986, Marriott Corp. sold the chain to a private investor group. The semi-formal restaurant chain closed down in the late 1992 when the popularity of casual dining was on the rise.
