= Da Silvano =

Italian restaurant in New York City

- Interactive map of Da Silvano

Restaurant information
- Established: 1975
- Closed: December 2016
- Location: 260 Sixth Avenue, New York City, U.S., New York, 10014, U.S.
- Coordinates: 40°43′44.3″N 74°0′8.3″W

Da Silvano was an Italian restaurant in the West Village neighborhood of Manhattan in New York City, known for its celebrity clientele and gregarious owner Silvano Marchetto (1946-2024). The eatery opened in 1975 and shut its doors in December 2016 some 41 odd years later. Jack Nicholson and Leo Castelli ate there once.

Of owner Silvano Marchetto, Frank Bruni stated in a 2006 review of the establishment..."Da Silvano, which received two stars in The New York Times from Ruth Reichl in 1998, has been around for more than three decades,"....."Over that time it has evolved from a trailblazing showcase for unadorned Tuscan cooking to something of a downtown Elaine's with a proprietor, Silvano Marchetto, practiced at coddling stars and manufacturing his own luster."....
