= Jimmy Weston's (jazz club) =

New York City restaurant and jazz club (1963–1989)

- Interactive map of Jimmy Weston's

Restaurant information
- Established: 1963
- Closed: 1989
- Owner: James L. Weston
- Manager: Nick Pappas
- Location: East 56th Street (1963–1970); 131 East 54th Street (1970–1989), New York City, New York, 10022, United States
- Coordinates: 40°45′33.7″N 73°58′15.4″W
- Other locations: Jimmy Weston's, Spring Lake, New Jersey

Jimmy Weston's Restaurant & Jazz Club was an American restaurant and jazz club in New York City, located on East 56th Street beginning in 1963, then, seven years later, moved it to 131 East 54th Street. Tommy Furtado was selected as the house musician and maintained that position until the club closed twenty years later. Its owner, Jimmy Weston (James L. Weston; 1922–1997), closed it in 1989. The New York Times obituary for Weston stated, "Given the restaurant's high-level clientele, it was inevitable that it served as a backdrop for social history. It was at Weston's that Mr. Sinatra patched up his feud with Liz Smith, and Howard Cosell got the call from Roone Arledge telling him he had been picked for a daring new idea called 'Monday Night Football.'"

== Notable employees ==
- Nick Pappas, maître d'
- Joe Rivera
- "Boots"
- Dino Pavlou
- Jim Charkalis
- Billy Mack

== Selected history ==
On February 28, 1977, Onwest, Inc., doing business as Jimmy Weston's Restaurant, filed a petition for Chapter 11 Bankruptcy, Southern District of New York.

== Sister restaurant in Spring Lake, New Jersey ==
In 1977, Weston and a partner, Billy Keegan, purchased Jack Sullivan's Lodge, a restaurant at the corner of Morris and Fifth Avenues in Spring Lake, New Jersey, remodeled it, renamed it "Jimmy Weston's", and operated it on the same model its counterpart in New York, alternating performers between the two.

== Notable performers at the New York location ==
The Tommy Furtado Trio was the house band. Woody Allen's Band, which made its debut in 1970, played an engagement at Weston's in New York.
