= Big Daddy's Restaurants =

U.S. restaurant chain

Coordinates: 40.59052°N 73.96056°W

Big Daddy's Restaurants was a chain of restaurants founded in 1964 on Coney Island Avenue in the Sheepshead Bay section of Brooklyn serving a myriad of food types ranging from European to Asian inspired dishes. In April, 1990, it was reported that Napp was looking to make a comeback with the Big Daddy's name by opening a location in Miami Beach. Napp died in November 1990, theoretically ending chances of revival.

== History ==
The first Big Daddy's Restaurant opened in 1964, and was located on Coney Island Avenue in the Sheepshead Bay section of Brooklyn, NY. It was known to be the only true competitor of Nathan's Famous Hot Dogs. The driving force behind Big Daddy's success was the partnership of Murray L. Handwerker, the nephew of Nathan Handwerker, founder of Nathan's Famous and Robert "Big Daddy" Napp.

Murray L. Handwerker's son, Robert "Bobby" Handwerker, also worked at Big Daddy's during its early years. A 1967 photograph of Bobby working at Big Daddy's appears on the restaurant's historical mementos website.

In addition to serving hot dogs and crinkle-cut French fries, Big Daddy's also served pizza, chow mein on a bun, roasted pork sandwiches, and had a full deli as well as a clam bar. The restaurant was known for its decor of red and white candy stripes and pictures of partner Robert Napp surrounded by the famous celebrities of that era. It was also known for offering kiddie rides in the parking lot to create a Coney Island atmosphere. In the 1968 film Bye Bye Braverman, a scene was shot with actor George Segal in front of Big Daddy's as well as on location throughout the borough of Brooklyn.

During the mid-1970s Miami club fighter Jerry Powers whose claim to fame was 44 fights in one year worked at Big Daddy's Restaurant on Lincoln Road in Miami Beach.

Drummer Howie Fields, who played with Harry Chapin, had his doubts about the Broadway show The Night That Made America Famous until, according to his website: "... late one cold night in Dec '74, eating a burger/fries/coke in a now defunct Brooklyn hot dog place called Big Daddy's (on Coney Island Avenue in Sheepshead Bay where I lived), thumbing through the free newspaper 'Good Times', coming across this tiny blurb, and being thrilled because, up until that moment, there was still some doubt in my mind as to whether the whole Broadway show thing was really going to happen."

== Locations ==
The Big Daddy's in Sheepshead Bay closed in 1977, The Lincoln Road Mall location closed in 1986, and the location on Washington Avenue on South Beach closed around 1991.

== Quotes ==
Former Brooklyn Borough President Marty Markowitz said on his official web-site "You know you're from Brooklyn if......You Went to Big Daddy's on Coney Island Avenue as a change from Nathan's".

== Ownership ==
One of the original partners, Murray L. Handwerker died on October 21, 1971, at the age of 47 leaving behind his wife and three children.

In an article by the U.S. Securities and Exchange Commission (SEC) News dated January 7, 1970, Napp and Handwerker filed a registration with the SEC seeking to take the company public, although nothing ever materialized.

Robert "Big Daddy" Napp unsuccessfully ran for the Miami Beach City Council in a popular election in 1977 where he lost by only 244 votes. Napp later said there were 710 overvotes unread by the machine, but no court would listen to him. In an article dated April 8, 1990 in the Miami Herald, Napp was looking to make a comeback with the Big Daddy's name by opening a location on Washington Avenue in Miami Beach. Napp died in November 1990.
