= The Great Gritzbe's Flying Food Show =

- Location within Chicago metropolitan area

Restaurant information
- Established: 1974
- Owner: Richard Melman
- Dress code: Casual
- Location: 21 East Chestnut Street, Chicago, Illinois, 60611, United States
- Coordinates: 41.898285°N 87.627223°W
- Reservations: No
- Other information: Closed 1983

The Great Gritzbe's Flying Food Show was the name of a popular Chicago restaurant during the 1970s.

It opened in 1974, under owner Richard Melman. The style was designed by Lettuce Entertain You. Institution magazine selected it as one of the top ten in design for 1975. The restaurant featured a cheese bar and a dessert bar. The interior was painted completely grey. Steve Stone, part owner, also worked there during the off season, as host, wine steward, waiter and bartender.

However, by 1983, business had slowed. Melman changed the name to The Not So Great Gritzbe's in a bid to revitalize the restaurant. Business continued to drop off, and several months later, the restaurant closed.

Currently, a condominium occupies the site.
