= Punk's Backyard Grill =

Restaurant in Maryland, United States

Coordinates: 38°59′26.4″N 76°32′49.5″W

Punk's Backyard Grill was a contemporary version of the classic American backyard cookout. Formerly open at the Westfield Annapolis Mall in Annapolis, Maryland, Punk's Backyard Grill is a fast casual style restaurant, with counter ordering and food runners and bussers. The restaurant had a full liquor license, serving beer, wine, and specialty cocktails. The menu was created by Dean Maupin, currently the executive chef at the Clifton Inn in Charlottesville, VA. Dean was trained during a four-year apprenticeship at the esteemed Greenbrier Hotel.

== Press ==
Listed in the 2009 and 2010 Washingtonian "Cheap Eats" issue, recommended as one of the top 50 bargain restaurants in the Washington DC area where two people can get a meal for under $50.

Awarded a "Best of Annapolis" award by What's Up? Annapolis magazine in 2009 for "Best Bang for Your Buck".

Recommended by Tom Sietsema of the Washington Post in a May 6, 2009 "First Bite" article.

Reviewed in the Baltimore Sun by Richard Gorelick -

Closed in January 2013 due to lease problems with Westfield Annapolis Mall
