= Devi (restaurant) =

Defunct restaurant in New York City

- Interactive map of Devi

Restaurant information
- Established: 2004
- Closed: 2007
- Location: 8 East 18th Street, New York City, New York, 10003, United States
- Coordinates: 40°44′17.4″N 73°59′28.3″W

Devi was a restaurant in the Flatiron District of Manhattan in New York City. Established in 2004, the restaurant had received a Michelin star. The restaurant closed in 2007.

== See also ==
- List of defunct restaurants of the United States
- List of Michelin-starred restaurants in New York City
