= Hot Chicken Takeover =

Chicken restaurant chain

- Type: Private
- Industry: Restaurants
- Genre: Fast casual
- Founded: April 2014; 12 years ago
- Founder: Joe DeLoss
- Headquarters: Columbus, Ohio
- Number of locations: none (2025)
- Key people: Gregg Majewski
- Owner: Craveworthy Brands
- Website: hotchickentakeover.com

Hot Chicken Takeover or HCT: Southern Chicken was an American fast casual fried chicken restaurant chain in Columbus, Ohio that specialized in Nashville hot chicken.

== History ==
Founder Joe DeLoss started the company after visiting Nashville, Tennessee and being introduced to the local specialty hot chicken in 2013. The company was initially founded as a pop-up restaurant in April 2014, before launching a crowdfunding campaign on Kickstarter later that year to fund the purchase of a food truck.

In 2021, the restaurant chain was acquired by Untamed Brands. Untamed Brands was taken over by Craveworthy Brands in May 2024.

In October 2024, Craveworthy Brands CEO, Gregg Majewski, announced they would be combining their Chicago-based chain The Budlong Southern Chicken, into the Hot Chicken Takeover concept, under the name HCT: Southern Chicken. Columbus-area locations will keep the Hot Chicken Takeover name. Along with the announcement, a new menu was unveiled that included chicken-fried steak, hushpuppies, cornbread and sweet tea.

The company received significant media coverage for its stated mission of being a fair chance employer that provides job opportunities to formerly incarcerated people who are reentering the workforce and other individuals who are not otherwise able to find work. In 2016, over 70% of Hot Chicken Takeover employees were formerly incarcerated or formerly affected by homelessness. Founder Joe DeLoss has stated that workers with former criminal histories are better and more reliable employees than others, and that the company employs anyone with "an orientation towards personal growth and a willingness to respond to coaching".

The company also provides various free professional development initiatives for its employees such as financial literacy training and private personal counseling, as well as emergency 0% payday loans or cash support so that employees are not at risk of predatory lenders.

== Locations ==
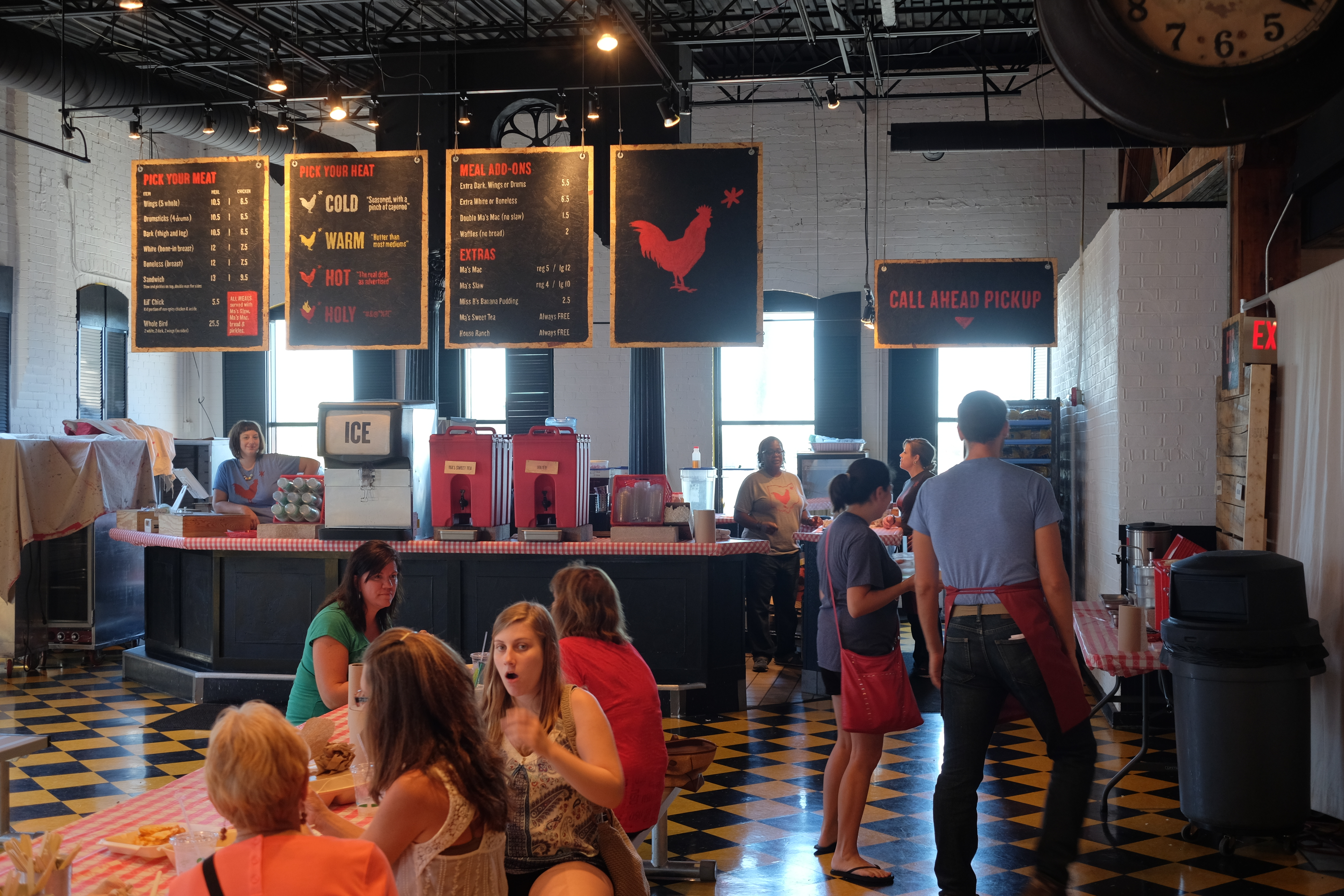
Hot Chicken Takeover's Downtown Columbus location in the historic North Market

In 2018, Hot Chicken Takeover had three locations in Columbus, Ohio. The first location was in the historic North Market building in downtown Columbus, the second, located in the Clintonville neighborhood and another at Easton Gateway in Easton Town Center. The company also continued to operate a food truck, which has previously been voted "Best Food Truck in Columbus" by the readers of local news blog Columbus Underground in 2015 and 2016. In 2019, they made their Cleveland area debut, opening a new location at Crocker Park in the western suburb of Westlake.

Joe DeLoss announced plans in a 2016 interview to expand via franchising.

In 2025, the company shut down five locations, one each in January, March, and July, and three in September, with the brand closing their final location, formerly located in North Market, on September 20, 2025.
