= Chelsea Place =

Restaurant in New York City

Coordinates: 40°44′31.1″N 74°0′4.2″W

Chelsea Place was a restaurant at 147 Eighth Avenue in New York City's Chelsea district, founded in 1974 and operational until 1992. It was unusual in that the restaurant was hidden in the back of an antique shop. In the back of the store was what appeared to be a large wardrobe with mullioned mirrored doors. Opening the doors, however, revealed a piano bar area. Passing through the bar, an unadorned door opened onto a staircase which led down to a basement seating area. This area contained several dining rooms surrounding a glass-enclosed garden which gave an atrium-like feel, having several windows placed along a wall near the top. The garden included such eclectic furnishings as a totem pole and a pond with ducks. Total seating capacity was around 100. The food was Northern Italian.

Joan and GianCarlo Santini, owners of the antique store, opened the restaurant in 1974.

Later in its existence, the restaurant became a jazz music venue. Chelsea Place closed in 1992.

== New Chelsea Place ==
In 1994, former New York City police officer Ed Uribe opened New Chelsea Place at the 147 Eighth Avenue location as a jazz venue. Performers scheduled for the opening included Johnny Parker and Alizon Lissance.
