= Manganaro's =

Manganaro's Grosseria Italiana
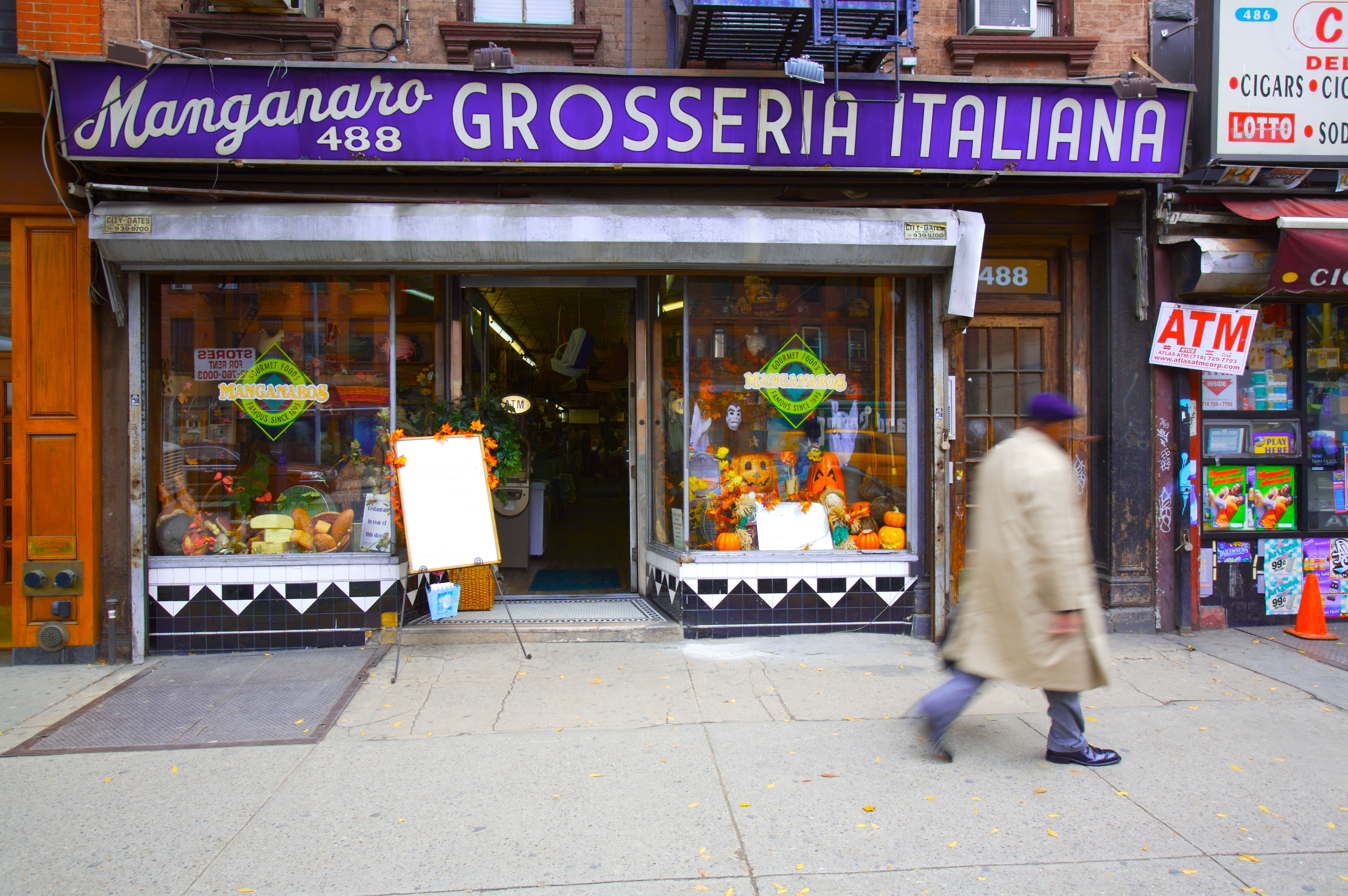
- The exterior of Manganaro's Grosseria Italiana.
- Interactive map of Manganaro's Grosseria Italiana

Restaurant information
- Established: 1893; 133 years ago
- Closed: 2012; 14 years ago
- Food type: Italian
- Location: 488 Ninth Avenue, New York City, USA
- Coordinates: 40.75554°N 73.99451°W
- Website: www.manganarofoods.com (defunct)

Manganaro's Grosseria Italiana, commonly referred to as Manganaro's, was an Italian market and deli on Ninth Avenue in the Hell's Kitchen neighborhood of Manhattan, New York City. It opened in 1893 and operated for 119 years, helping to introduce the hero sandwich to Americans. The family closed the business and put the property up for sale in 2012.

The business was founded in 1893 by Ernest Petrucci as a wine and spirits store, Petrucci's Wines & Brandies, that also sold groceries. Its location at 488 Ninth Avenue near 37th Street was on a stretch of the avenue that remained lined with exotic food stores for decades. After the enactment of Prohibition in the U.S. in 1919, Petrucci's nephew James Manganaro, an immigrant from Naples, took over the store in the 1920s and changed the name; in 1927 he was able to buy the building. Manganaro may have invented the hero sandwich, and played a role in introducing it to Americans.

On his death in 1953, Manganaro's passed to his brother Louis and sister Nina Manganaro Dell'Orto and their spouses; in 1955, with a publicity agent's help, they invented the six-foot "Hero-Boy" sandwich, which was successful enough for one of Dell'Orto's four sons to go on the original version of the TV quiz show I've Got a Secret, and for the family to open a sandwich shop next door at 492–494 Ninth Avenue the following year, while continuing to operate a deli and lunch counter in the rear of the grocery store.

In 1962, Louis Manganaro retired and two of his four nephews took over the grocery store and the other two the sandwich shop, Manganaro's Hero-Boy, and the businesses were separated.

Sal Dell'Orto, who bought out his brother's half ownership of the grocery store, and James Dell'Orto, who bought out his brother's half ownership of the sandwich shop, fell out over rights to the "Manganaro's Hero-Boy" name, trademarked by the sandwich shop in 1969, and advertising for party sandwich telephone hotlines, which led to two separate court cases. The business' neon sign installed in the early 1930s, which became blinking in the 1960s, was turned off in 2000 so that Manganaro's Hero-Boy could not benefit from it. The grocery store was repeatedly found at fault over the hotline and was ordered to pay damages to the sandwich shop, and the financial drain plus waning popularity, some of it due to the declining neighborhood, led to the decision to sell the building and close. This was first announced early in 2011, but the building was withdrawn from the market; the business then closed in late February 2012.

Anthony Bourdain featured the store (and its famously brusque service) in an episode of No Reservations in 2009.

Bic Runga's song "Sway" music video also featured the store.

== See also ==
- List of Italian restaurants
