= Nicky Blair's =

Restaurant information
- Established: 1986 in Los Angeles; 1996 in Las Vegas
- Closed: 1993 in Los Angeles; 1998 in Las Vegas
- Location: West Hollywood, California, U.S.

Nicky Blair's was a high-end Italian restaurant on the Sunset Strip on Sunset Boulevard in West Hollywood, next to Le Dome. It thrived in the late 1980s and early 1990s. It was named after the proprietor, Nicky Blair, a bit-part film actor who starred in over 75 movies. He established it in 1986. Blair opened a Nicky Blair's in 1996 in Las Vegas and ran it until his death from liver cancer in 1998.

The Los Angeles Nicky Blair's closed in 1993, and the Las Vegas version closed in 1998, the year of Blair's death.

== Service ==
The restaurant, with a piano bar, served Italian and continental cuisine, including freshly made pasta, scampi, scallopini, and grilled fish and meat dishes. A 1991 edition of LA Access described it as a "Noisy, crowded, and glitzy singles bar", which was "good for star-gazing".

== Notable patrons ==
The restaurant was a favorite evening haunt of numerous actors and celebrities, such as Frank Sinatra, a close friend of Blair's, and the Rat Pack. Sinatra and friends would play poker in the kitchen to escape the attention of fans and the press. In one incident:

A black waiter accidentally spilled a tray of glasses on the floor. Nikki Blair, the restaurant owner, fired the man on the spot for having disturbed Mr. Sinatra. Frank, however, had other ideas. He called Blair over to the poker table, grabbed him by the shirt and asked Blair, "Nikki, how much is one of those glasses worth?" "About 5 dollars," replied Blair. Sinatra then told the waiter to break every glass he could find in the kitchen. After several hundred glasses were broken, Sinatra motioned one of his bodyguards to give him (Sinatra) a thick roll of $100 bills. Frank then handed the roll to Blair and gave the now terrified restaurateur some chilling advice: "Nikki, this guy can now break as many glasses as he wants for the rest of his life. And every time I come here, I want to see that he's still working for you. Is that clear?"

Clint Eastwood celebrated his 1992 Oscar success at the restaurant. Sylvester Stallone also frequented Nicky Blair's and would take his dates there.
