= List of the oldest restaurants in the United States =

This list of the oldest restaurants in the United States includes currently operating restaurants that were founded before 1900. Most of the establishments are located in the Northeastern United States, many of them predate the Civil War, and a handful predate the Revolutionary War.

== List of the oldest restaurants in the United States ==
Year of opening	Age (years)	Restaurant	Opened by	City	State	GPS	Claim to fame	Sources
1673	353	White Horse Tavern	William Mayes, Sr.	Newport	Rhode Island	41°29′29″N 71°18′50″W	Oldest restaurant in America (non-continuous)	
1681	345	King George II Inn	Samuel Clift	Bristol	Pennsylvania	40°05′41″N 74°51′22″W	Oldest continuously operated inn in America and oldest restaurant/bar in Pennsylvania	
1686	340	The Wayside Inn	David Howe as "Howe's Tavern"	Sudbury	Massachusetts	42°21′28″N 71°28′5″W	Titular inn in Longfellow's Tales of a Wayside Inn; oldest restaurant in America (continuous)	The inn's archive has documents from 1686 onward, including the official inn license granted to the first innkeeper, David Howe, in 1716.
1706	320	Ye Olde Centerton Inn	unknown	Pittsgrove	New Jersey	39°31′32″N 75°10′03″W	One of the oldest restaurants in NJ	
1716	310	Concord's Colonial Inn	James Minot	Concord	Massachusetts	42°27′42″N 71°20′58″W	One of the Inn's original buildings was used as a storehouse for arms and provisions during the Battles of Lexington and Concord	
1719	307	Spring House Tavern	unknown	Spring House	Pennsylvania	40°11′07″N 75°13′39″W	American soldiers were stationed here during 1778	
1728	298	The Red Fox Inn & Tavern	Joseph Chinn	Middleburg	Virginia	38°58′05″N 77°44′11″W	Oldest continuously operating inn and tavern in Virginia	
1737	289	Stage House Tavern	John Sutton	Scotch Plains	New Jersey	40°39′05″N 74°23′55″W	Originally called the Stage House Inn. It's rumored that Gen. George Washington enjoyed a pint or two there.	
1742	284	Black Horse Tavern & Pub	Ebenezer Byram	Mendham	New Jersey	40°46′34″N 74°36′05″W	Started out as just an Inn	
1743	283	The Clinton House	unknown	Clinton	New Jersey	40°38′07″N 74°54′52″W		
1743	282	The Blue Bell Inn	unknown	Blue Bell	Pennsylvania	40°09′22″N 75°16′01″W	Originally known as the White Horse Inn, George Washington and his troops are said to have frequented the inn during the Battle of Germantown.	
1745	281	Rocky Hill Inn	Harrison family	Rocky Hill	New Jersey	40°23′59″N 74°38′12″W		
1754	272	The '76 House	Casparus Mabie	Tappan	New York	41°01′11″N 73°56′31″W	Oldest restaurant in New York state.	The '76 House, Retrieved August 8, 2021
1762	264	Fraunces Tavern	Samuel Fraunces	New York City	New York	40°42′12″N 74°00′41″W	Oldest standing structure in Manhattan	
1775	251	The Horse You Came in On Saloon	unknown	Baltimore	Maryland	39°16′53″N 76°35′39″W	Oldest continuously operating saloon in the United States	
1776	250	The Griswold Inn	Sala Griswold	Essex	Connecticut	41°21′05″N 72°23′13″W	Oldest Inn in America	
1779	247	Old Talbott Tavern	George Talbott	Bardstown	Kentucky	37°48′33″N 85°28′03″W	Oldest western stagecoach stop still in operation	
1780	246	The Cranbury Inn	unknown	Cranbury	New Jersey	40°18′28″N 74°31′04″W	Built in 1750 and 1765 as a place to eat, drink, get horses and rest.	
1780	246	Warren Tavern	Eliphelet Newell	Charlestown	Massachusetts	42°22′27″N 71°03′48″W		
1783	243	The Milleridge Inn	Mary Willets	Jericho	New York	40°47′30″N 73°32′16″W	Started by Quakers; quartered soldiers during the American Revolution; house became inn in 1783	
1785	241	Gadsby's Tavern	John Wise	Alexandria	Virginia	38°48′20″N 77°02′37″W (second tavern on site built 1785, enlarged in 1792, first tavern on site Mason's Ordinary opened in 1749)	Historic Confederation/Federalist Period tavern & ballroom	
1795	231	Bell in Hand Tavern	Jimmy Wilson	Boston	Massachusetts	42°21′41″N 71°03′25″W	Oldest continuously operating tavern in US (except for Prohibition)	
1803	223	The Golden Lamb	Jonas Seaman	Lebanon	Ohio	39°26′01″N 84°12′30″W	Oldest continuously operated inn and restaurant in Ohio	
1826	200	Union Oyster House	Hawes Atwood	Boston	Massachusetts	42°21′41″N 71°03′25″W	Oldest continuously operated restaurant in America	
1831	195	New Hudson Inn	Unknown	New Hudson	Michigan	42°30′42″N 83°36′53″W	Oldest business in Michigan	
1834	192	J. Huston Tavern	Joseph Huston, Sr.	Arrow Rock	Missouri	39°04′12″N 92°56′42″W	Oldest continuously serving restaurant west of the Mississippi River	
1838	188	Arnold's Bar and Grill	Susan Fawcett	Cincinnati	Ohio	39°06′19″N 84°30′36″W	Oldest continuously operating bar in Ohio	
1840	186	Antoine's	Antoine Alciatore	New Orleans	Louisiana	29°57′24″N 90°03′59″W	Oldest family-run restaurant in America	
1848	178	La Mallorquina	Antonio Vidal Llinás	San Juan	Puerto Rico	18°27′55″N 66°06′55″W	Claims to be first restaurant in Puerto Rico	
1849	177	Tadich Grill	Nikola Budrovich; Frano Kosta; Antonio Gasparich	San Francisco	California	37°47′36″N 122°23′58″W (moved here in 1967)	Oldest continuously running restaurant in California	
1852 (August 23)	174	Breitbach's Country Dining	founder unknown	Balltown	Iowa	42°37′38″N 90°49′13″W	Oldest restaurant in Iowa	
1854	172	McSorley's Old Ale House	John McSorley	New York City	New York	40°43′44″N 73°59′23″W	Oldest Irish saloon in NYC and one of the last of the "Men Only" pubs, admitting women only after being legally forced to do so in 1970	
1856	170	Old Ebbitt Grill	William Ebbitt	Washington	District of Columbia	38°53′53″N 77°02′00″W (moved here in 1983)	Oldest saloon in Washington	
1856	170	Tujague's Restaurant	Guillaume Tujague	New Orleans	Louisiana	29°57′18″N 90°03′54″W	2nd oldest restaurant in New Orleans	
1857	169	Gluek's Restaurant & Bar	Gottlieb Gluek	Minneapolis	Minnesota	44°58′46″N 93°16′26″W	Oldest continuously operated business in Minneapolis	
1860	166	McGillin's Olde Ale House	Catherine McGillin; William McGillin	Philadelphia	Pennsylvania	39°57′01″N 75°09′45″W	Oldest bar in Philadelphia	
1861	165	The Old Clam House	founder unknown	San Francisco	California	37°44′35″N 122°24′17″W	Began as a bar in 1891. Became a restaurant in 1940.	
1864	162	Pete's Tavern	founder unknown	New York City	New York	40°38′52″N 73°57′46″W	Oldest continuously operated bar in New York City	
1866	160	Scholz Garten	August Scholz	Austin, Texas	Texas	30°16′40″N 97°44′11″W	Oldest restaurant in Texas	
1867	159	Sam's Grill & Seafood Restaurant	Michael Bolan Moraghan	San Francisco	California	37°47′27″N 122°24′12″W	Originally an oyster stall	
1870	156	Claudio's Tavern	Manuel Claudio	Greenport	New York	41°06′07″N 72°21′33″W	Oldest restaurant continuously owned by the same family (until 2018)	
1870	156	Original Oyster House	Hugh Lynn	Pittsburgh	Pennsylvania	40°26′27″N 80°00′09″W	Oldest bar and restaurant in Pittsburgh	
1870	156	Weidmann's	Felix Weidmann	Meridian	Mississippi	32°21′47″N 88°41′56″W	Oldest restaurant in Mississippi	
1879	147	Huber's	Huber	Portland	Oregon	45°31′12″N 122°40′29″W	Oldest restaurant in Oregon	
1885	141	Tivoli Bar and Grill	Angelo and Giovanni "John" Della Maggiora	San Diego	California	32°42′38″N 117°9′32.3″W	Oldest bar/restaurant in San Diego	
1885	141	Keens Steakhouse	Albert Keen	New York City	New York	40°45′03″N 73°59′11″W	Only remaining business of what was the Herald Square Theater District	
1886	140	Fior d'Italia	Angelo Del Monte	San Francisco	California	37°48′16″N 122°24′49″W	The current restaurant at the San Remo Hotel (2237 Mason St.) is the seventh location for the former bordello and eatery, including a tent operation for nearly a year after the 1906 earthquake and fire.	
1887	139	Browne's Irish Market & Deli	Ed and Mary Flavin	Kansas City	Missouri	39°04′03″N 94°35′34″W	Oldest retail business in Kansas City	
1887	139	Peter Luger Steak House	Peter Luger	Brooklyn	New York	40°42′36″N 73°57′45″W	New York's top-rated Zagat steakhouse	
1888	138	Katz's Delicatessen	Morris Iceland; Hyman Iceland	New York City	New York	40°43′20″N 73°59′14″W (moved here in 1970)	New York's oldest deli	
1893 (November 17)	133	Buckhorn Exchange	Henry Zietz	Denver	Colorado	39°43′56″N 105°00′18″W	First liquor license in Colorado	
1893	133	Commander's Palace	Emile Commander	New Orleans	Louisiana	29°55′44″N 90°05′03″W	Oldest continuously operated restaurant in Uptown New Orleans	
1898	128	Louis' Lunch	Louis Lassen	New Haven	Connecticut	41°18′23″N 72°55′49″W	one of the oldest hamburger restaurants	
1895	131	The Berghoff	Herman Berghoff	Chicago	Illinois	41°52′45.5″N 87°37′42.2″W	German restaurant	
1896	130	Rao's	Raos	New York City	New York	40°47′38.16″N 73°56′3.2″W	Italian restaurant	

== Closures ==
Samuel Cole opened Cole's Inn 392 years ago on March 4, 1634, and was the first tavern in America. It was on Washington St., now Downtown Crossing, in Boston, Massachusetts. The building was destroyed by fire in 1711, 315 years ago.

Buckman Tavern was built 316 years ago in 1710 by Benjamin Muzzey (1657–1735). His license was granted 333 years ago in 1693. It was the first public house in Lexington, Massachusetts. His great-granddaughter and her husband John Buckman owned it at the time of the Battles of Lexington and Concord (April 19, 1775). Several dozen militiamen gathered there to await the arrival of the British troops. It ceased restaurant operations in the 1910s and is now a museum.

Boston landmark Durgin-Park was founded 152 years ago in 1874, and closed its doors on January 12, 2019, after operating for approximately 145 years.

Jack's Restaurant was opened 163 years ago in 1863 by George Voges in downtown San Francisco, California. It became a brewery in 2002, and permanently closed in May 2009, 17 years ago. It has been a San Francisco landmark since 1981.

The Jacob Wirth Restaurant was founded 158 years ago in 1868, operated for 150 years in Boston before permanently closing 8 years ago on June 9, 2018, after a fire damaged the building.

Jules Maes Saloon had been open since 138 years ago in 1888 and was possibly the oldest restaurant in Seattle, but it closed permanently in July 2020 as a result of the coronavirus pandemic.

== See also ==
- Tavern
- Inn
