= The Old Clam House =

Restaurant in California

Coordinates: 37.74313°N 122.40486°W

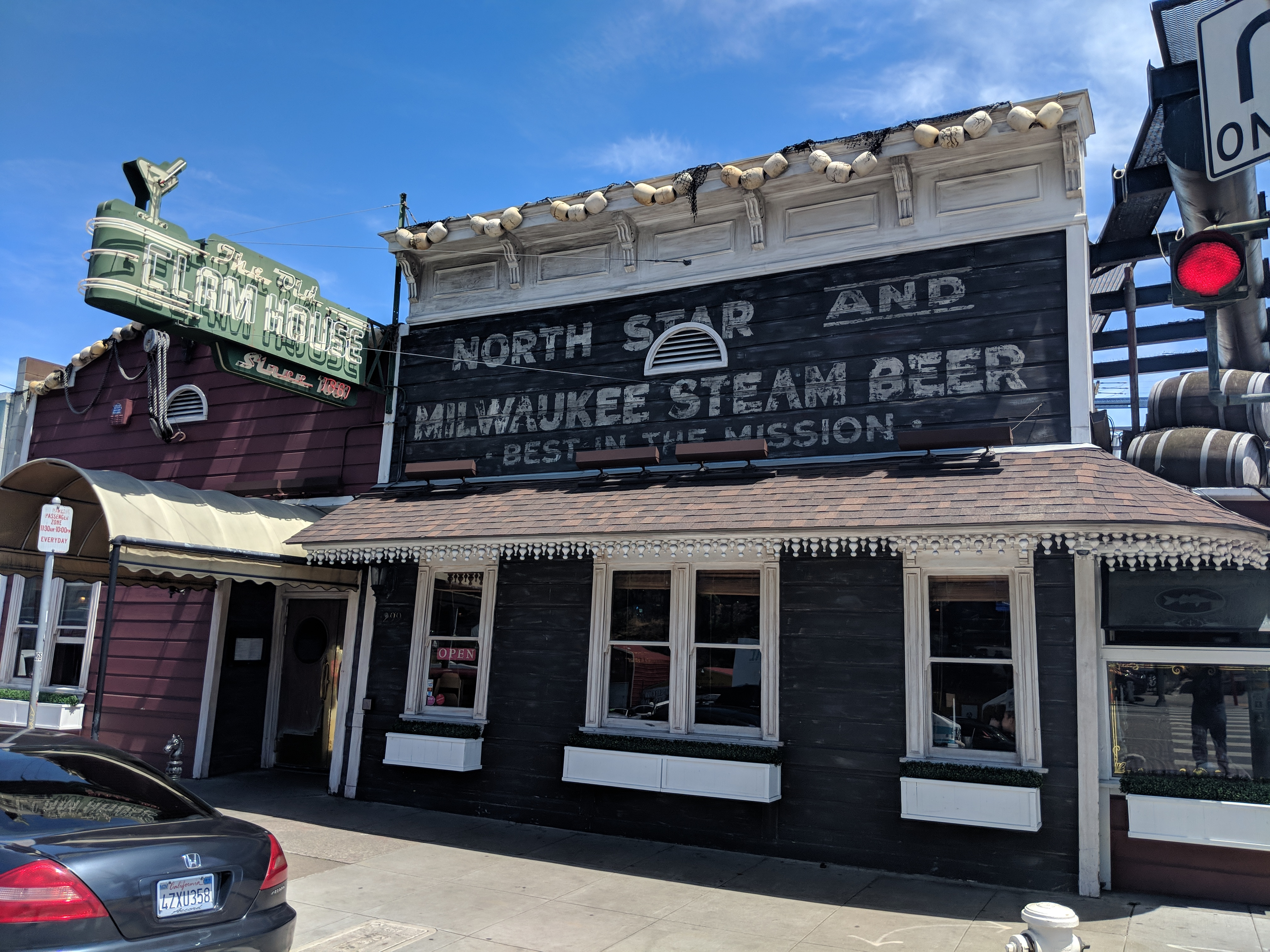
- The Old Clam House in 2019
- Interactive map of The Old Clam House

Restaurant information
- Established: 1861
- Owner: Filomena Florese
- Previous owners: Jerry Dal Bozzo; Dante Serafini
- Food type: Seafood
- Dress code: Casual
- Location: 299 Bayshore Boulevard, Bayview, San Francisco, California, 94124, United States
- Website: theoldclamhouse.com

The Old Clam House is the oldest continuously operating restaurant in its original location in San Francisco, California. The restaurant is located at 299 Bayshore Boulevard in the Bayview neighborhood. It was opened in 1861 to sell food to workers on the waterfront. In 2023, this restaurant is one of the oldest in the United States.

As a result of the COVID-19 pandemic, The Old Clam House closed in March 2020, and in 2021, the restaurant was put up for sale by the owners, Jerry Dal Bozzo and Dante Serafini (who also owned The Stinking Rose restaurant), who had decided to retire. The restaurant was sold to Filomena Fluoresce, who reopened it in April 2022.

== See also ==
- Jack's Restaurant
- Tadich Grill
