= Central Saloon =

Bar and restaurant in Seattle, Washington, U.S.

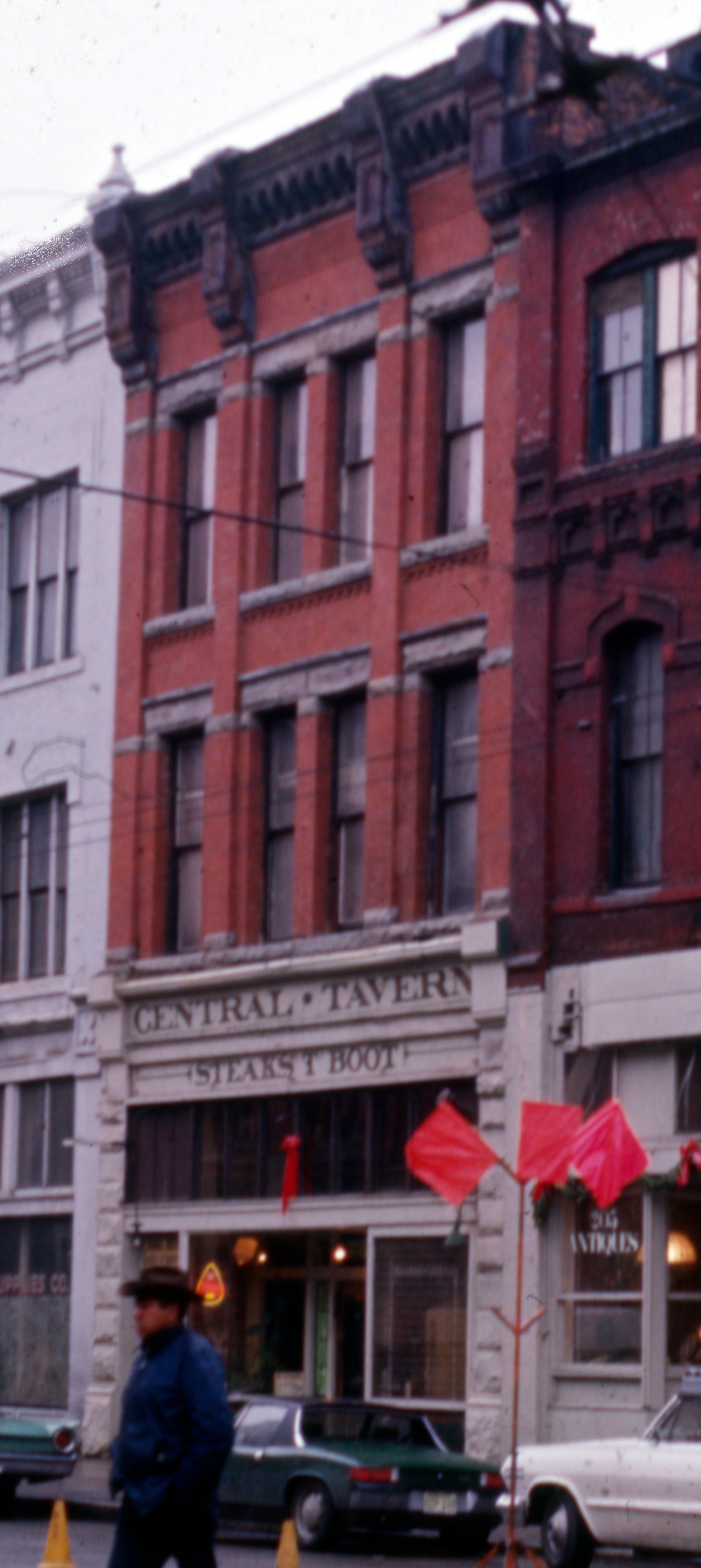
- Central Tavern, 1970s
- Interactive map of Central Saloon

Restaurant information
- Location: 207 1st Avenue South, Seattle, Washington, 98104, United States
- Coordinates: 47°36′2.2″N 122°20′4″W

Central Saloon is a bar, restaurant and music venue in Seattle, in the U.S. state of Washington. Established in 1892, the bar is among the city's oldest.

The bar is located in the Pioneer Square neighborhood, the oldest in the city.

Lonely Planet says, "It may be two years younger than the official 'Oldest Bar in Seattle' (Georgetown's Jules Maes), but the Central isn't exactly modern. More of a locals' hangout than an object of historical interest, this long, narrow joint makes grotty bathrooms and blah food seem charming, by virtue of cheap suds, friendly barkeeps and a comfortable, unfussy vibe. Nirvana, Soundgarden and most of the grunge nobility have played here, and live music still happens regularly." Many other bands in the grunge scene and other local rock acts played early shows at the venue, including Nirvana's first Seattle concert, which led to them getting signed by the Sub Pop record label.

In June 2022, the owners of the bar purchased the building where it is located, ensuring that it won't be sold or redeveloped.
