= Jack's Restaurant =

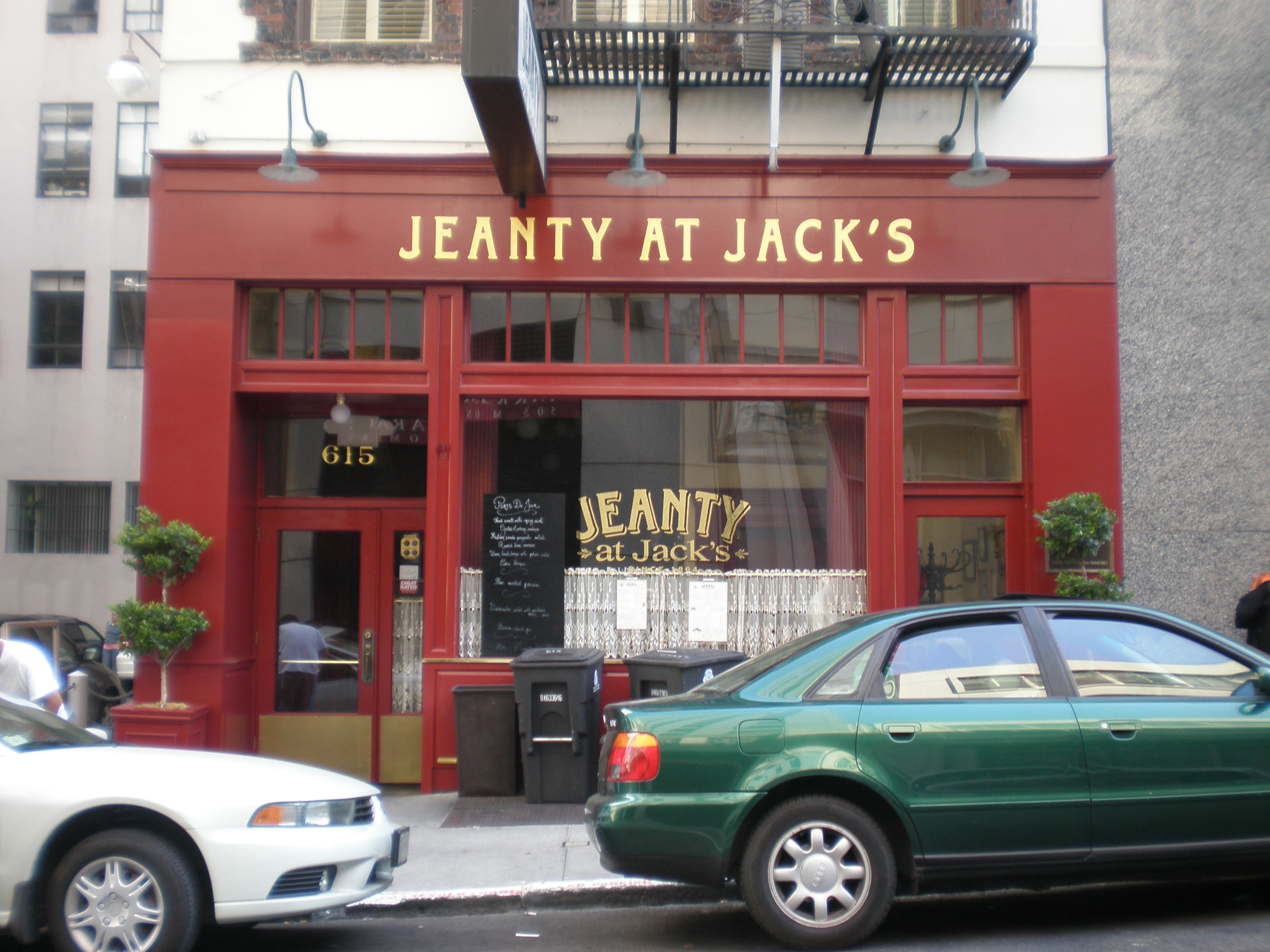
- Jack's in 2008, when it was Jeanty at Jack's
- Interactive map of Jack's Restaurant
- 37°47′36.8″N 122°24′12.6″W
- Location: 615 Sacramento Street, San Francisco, California, United States

History
- Built: 1863

San Francisco Designated Landmark
- Designated: December 6, 1981
- Reference no.: 146

Jack's Restaurant is a historic building and a former restaurant in the Financial District of San Francisco, California. Opened in 1864, Jack’s was the second oldest restaurant in the city for many years, following Tadich Grill. After being closed for many years, it was reopened in November 2025 as a private events space.

The building has been listed as a San Francisco Designated Landmark since 1981.

== History ==
In 1864. French-born chef George Voges opened the restaurant at 615 Sacramento Street, and named it Jack's after the jackrabbits that lived nearby. From 1996 until 1998, the building was closed for renovations and a seismic retrofit. The sixth owners were restaurateurs Gus and John Konstin, who re-opened the restaurant in 1998.

In 2002, French-born chef Philippe Jeanty purchased Jack's, later renaming it Jeanty at Jack's, and operated it as a brasserie, until it abruptly closed in May 2009.

In June 2016, Bar Works purchased the building for a reported US$3.55 million, announcing plans to convert the location into a co-working space, with food and a bar.

In November 2025, Jack's was reopened as a private venue, described as a "civic salon", by Skylight, a venue development company. It was planned to serve French bistro food overseen by Rupert Blease, formerly of Lord Stanley, and Tommy Halvorson, formerly of Serpentine.

== See also ==
- List of the oldest restaurants in the United States
