= Broiler (disambiguation) =

Broiler may refer to:

- Broiler, (Gallus domesticus), a type of chicken
- a cooking device used for broiling, i.e. cooking food by applying heat from above
- Charbroiler, a cooking device sometimes referred to simply as a broiler
- Broiler (music producers), Norwegian DJ duo
- Broilers, German Punk rock band from Düsseldorf

== See also ==
- Broiler industry, the process by which broiler chickens are reared and prepared for meat consumption
- Barbecue grill, a device which cooks food by applying heat from below
- Gridiron (cooking), a metal grate with parallel bars typically used for grilling
- Boiler (power generation), is a device used to create steam by applying heat energy to water.
