= Wolfsbane =

Wolfsbane may refer to:

== Plants ==
- Aconitum, a genus of toxic flowering plants of the northern hemisphere
  - Aconitum lycoctonum or northern wolfsbane
  - Aconitum napellus
- Arnica montana, a toxic European flowering plant

== Arts and entertainment ==
- Wolfsbane (band), an English heavy metal/hard rock band
  - Wolfsbane (album), 1994
- Wolfsbane (character), a Marvel Comics superhero
- Wolfsbane, a 2003 Doctor Who Past Doctor Adventures novel by Jacqueline Rayner
- Wolfsbane, novel in the Horus Heresy series by Guy Haley
- Wolfsbane, a 1978 novel by Craig Thomas (author)
- Wolf's Bane, a 1993 fantasy book set in the Lone Wolf universe
- Sir Peter Wolf's-Bane, a title Aslan gives to Peter Pevensie in C. S. Lewis' The Lion, the Witch and the Wardrobe

== Businesses ==
- Wolfsbane (restaurant), a Michelin-starred restaurant in San Francisco, California

== See also ==
- Wolfbane (novel), a 1959 novel by Frederik Pohl and C. M. Kornbluth
- Wolfbane, a 2022 novel in Michelle Paver's Chronicles of Ancient Darkness series
