= Lexington Avenue =

North-south avenue in Manhattan, New York

- Irving Place
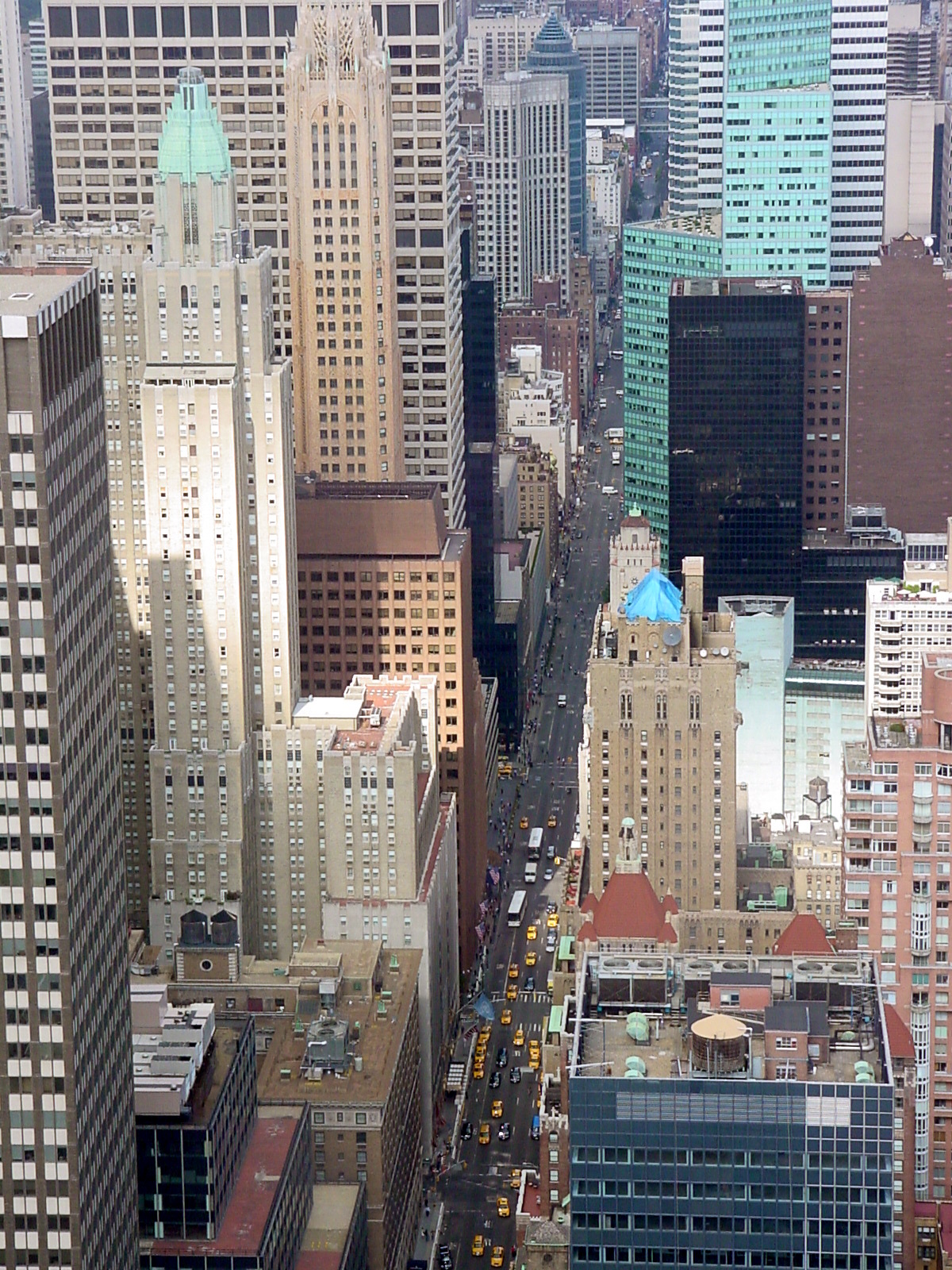
- Lexington Avenue seen from the top of the Chrysler Building
- Namesake: Battle of Lexington
- Maintained by: NYCDOT
- Length: 5.8 mi (9.3 km)
- Location: Manhattan, New York City, U.S.
- South end: 14th Street in Gramercy Park
- Major junctions: Third Avenue Bridge in East Harlem
- North end: 131st Street in East Harlem
- East: Third Avenue
- West: Park Avenue

Construction
- Commissioned: 1832
- Completed: 1836

Lexington Avenue, often colloquially abbreviated as "Lex", is an avenue on the East Side of Manhattan in New York City. The avenue carries southbound one-way traffic from East 131st Street to Gramercy Park at East 21st Street. Along its 5.5-mile (8.9-kilometer), 110-block route, Lexington Avenue runs through Harlem, Carnegie Hill, the Upper East Side, Midtown, and Murray Hill to a point of origin that is centered on Gramercy Park. South of Gramercy Park, the axis continues as Irving Place from 20th Street to East 14th Street.

Lexington Avenue was not one of the streets included in the Commissioners' Plan of 1811 street grid, so the addresses for cross streets do not start at an even hundred number, as they do with avenues that were originally part of the plan.

== History ==
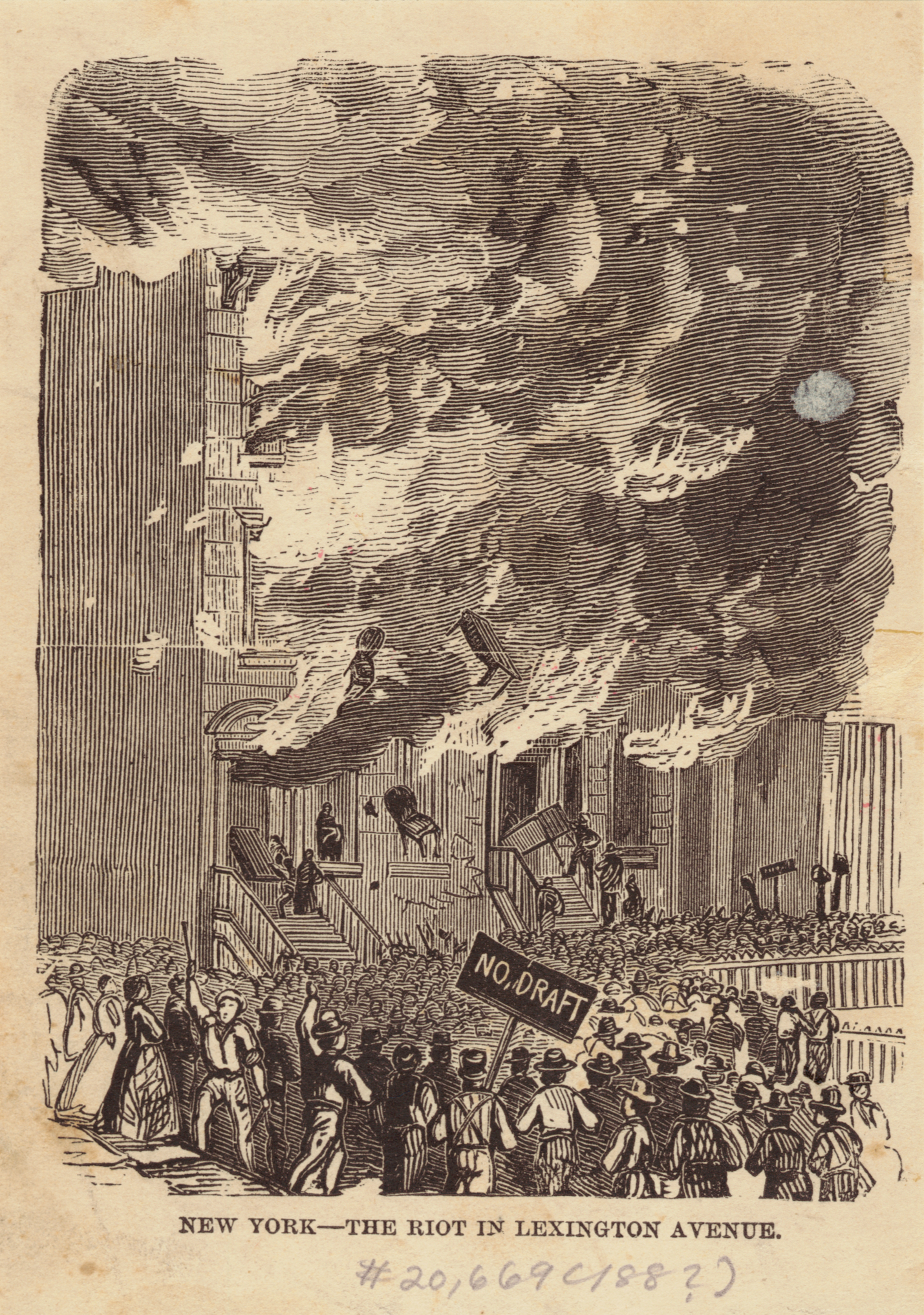
Draft Riots in Lexington Avenue, 1863

Both Lexington Avenue and Irving Place began in 1832 when Samuel Ruggles, a lawyer and real-estate developer, petitioned the New York State Legislature to approve the creation of a new north–south avenue between the existing Third and Fourth Avenues, between 14th and 30th Streets. Ruggles had purchased land in the area and was developing it as a planned community of townhouses around a private park, which he called Gramercy Park. He was also developing property around Union Square and wanted the new road to improve the value of these tracts. The legislation was approved, and, as the owner of most of the land along the route of the new street, Ruggles was assessed for the majority of its cost. Ruggles named the southern section, below 20th Street, which opened in 1833, after his friend Washington Irving. The northern section, which opened three years later, in 1836, was named after the Battle of Lexington in the American Revolutionary War.

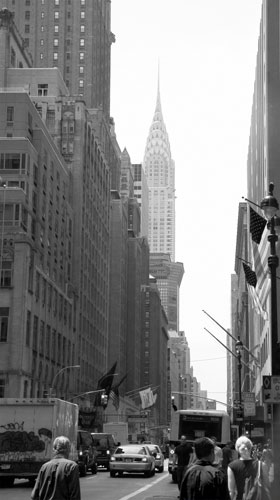
Lexington Avenue seen from 50th Street with the Chrysler Building in the background

In 1899, Lexington Avenue was the location of the first arrest in New York City for speeding when a bicycle patrolman overtook cabdriver Jacob German, who had been racing down the avenue at the "reckless" speed of 12 mph (19 km/h). The portion of Lexington Avenue above East 42nd Street was reconstructed at the same time as the IRT Lexington Avenue Line of the New York City Subway. The widened street and the subway line both opened on July 17, 1918.

Portions of the avenue were widened in 1955, which required eminent domain takings of the facades of some structures along Lexington.

Lexington Avenue has carried one-way (downtown) traffic since July 17, 1960.

The 2007 New York City steam explosion sent a geyser of hot steam up from beneath the avenue at 41st Street, resulting in one death and more than 40 injuries.

== Description ==
=== Lexington Avenue ===
Lexington Avenue runs one-way southbound for its entire length from 131st Street to 21st Street. Parallel to Lexington Avenue lies Park Avenue to its west and Third Avenue to its east. The avenue is largely commercial at ground level, with offices above. There are clusters of hotels in the 30s and 40s, roughly from the avenue's intersection with 30th Street through to its intersection with 49th Street, and apartment buildings farther north.

There are numerous structures designated as New York City Landmarks (NYCL), National Historic Landmarks (NHL), and National Register of Historic Places (NRHP) on Lexington Avenue. From south to north (in increasing address order), they include:

- Russell Sage Foundation Building and Annex (NYCL)
- George Washington Hotel, 23 Lexington Avenue (NRHP, NHL)
- 69th Regiment Armory, 68 Lexington Avenue (NRHP, NHL, NYCL)
- Chester A. Arthur House, 123 Lexington Avenue (NRHP, NHL)
- New York School of Applied Design for Women, 160 Lexington Avenue (NRHP, NYCL)
- Chanin Building, at 42nd Street (NRHP, NYCL)
- Socony-Mobil Building, at 42nd Street (NYCL)
- Chrysler Building, 405 Lexington Avenue (NRHP, NYCL)
- Graybar Building, 420 Lexington Avenue (NYCL)
- The Lexington Hotel NYC, 511 Lexington Avenue (NYCL)
- Shelton Hotel, 525 Lexington Avenue (NYCL)
- Waldorf Astoria New York, between 49th and 50th Streets (NYCL)
- Beverly Hotel (now The Benjamin), at 50th Street
- Summit Hotel, 569 Lexington Avenue (NYCL)
- General Electric Building, 570 Lexington Avenue (NYCL)
- Citigroup Center, 601 Lexington Avenue (NYCL)
- Central Synagogue, 652 Lexington Avenue (NRHP, NHL, NYCL)
- Barbizon 63, at 63rd Street (NRHP, NYCL)
- Church of St. Vincent Ferrer, 869 Lexington Avenue (NRHP, NYCL)
- Seventh Regiment Armory, between 66th and 67th Streets (NRHP, NYCL)
- 131–135 East 66th Street (NYCL)
- 130–134 East 67th Street (NYCL)
- 133 East 80th Street (NRHP)
- St. Jean Baptiste Roman Catholic Church, 1067-1071 Lexington Avenue (NRHP, NYCL)
- Public School 72, 1674 Lexington Avenue (NYCL)

=== Irving Place ===
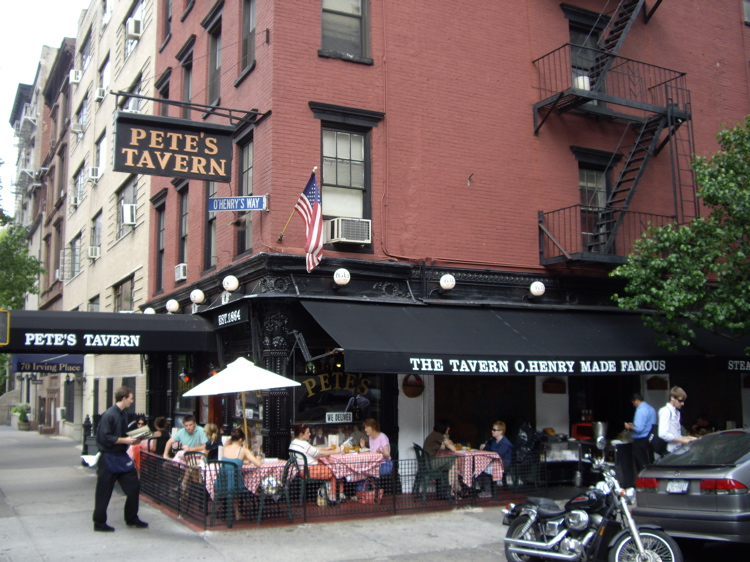
Pete's Tavern

In contrast to Lexington Avenue, the six-block stretch of Irving Place from 14th to 20th Street at Gramercy Park carries two-way traffic and is decidedly local in nature. After the opening of Union Square in 1839, the Irving Place area became one of the most sought-after residential neighborhoods in the city, a situation which was only enhanced by the development of Gramercy Park to the north and Stuyvesant Square to the east.

An assortment of restaurants and bars line Irving Place, including Pete's Tavern, New York's oldest surviving saloon, where O. Henry supposedly conceived of his short story "The Gift of the Magi", and which survived Prohibition disguised as a flower shop. Irving Plaza, on East 15th Street and Irving, hosts numerous concerts for both well-known and indie bands and draws a crowd almost every night. Another component of the avenue are the large apartment buildings which line the street from Gramercy Park to 17th Street. Also at 17th, a small bed-and-breakfast, the Inn at Irving Place, occupies two Greek Revival architecture townhouses built in 1840–1841 and renovated between 1991 and 1995.

Historically and architecturally significant are 47 and 49 Irving Place—the latter where Washington Irving is said to have lived, but did not—which are part of the East 17th Street/Irving Place Historic District, and 19 Gramercy Park on the corner of 20th Street, part of the Gramercy Park Historic District.

Offices located on Irving Place include those of The Nation magazine, the New York branch of AMORC and the Seafarers and International House mission. There are also a number of clinics and official city buildings along the street, including Washington Irving High School and the headquarters of the New York City Human Resources Administration. The bottom of the street is anchored by the rear of the Zeckendorf Towers condominium apartment complex on the west side, and the Consolidated Edison Building on the east.

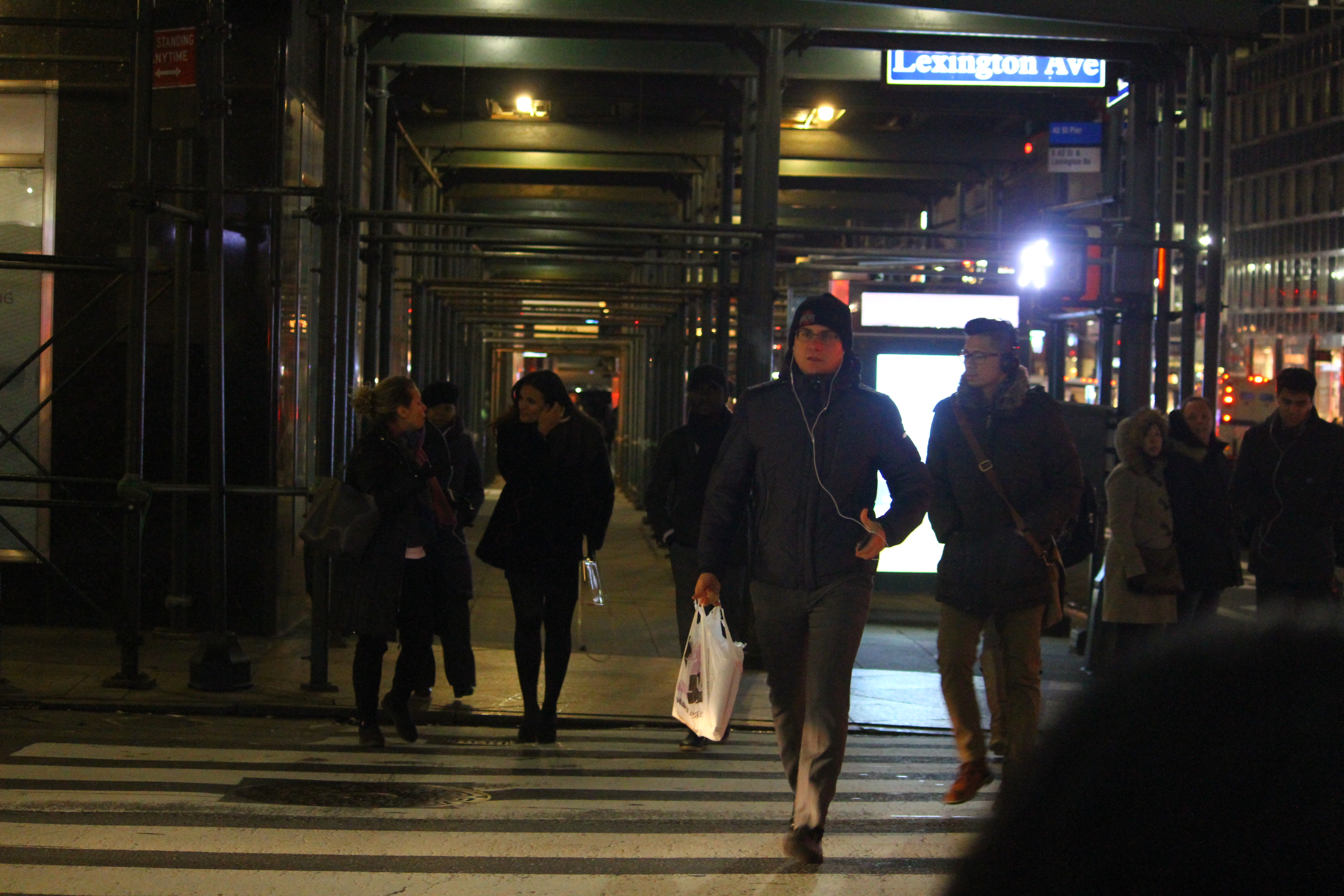
Lexington Avenue, January 2017

== Public transportation ==
The following buses use Lexington Avenue between the following streets (uptown buses run along Third Avenue):

- The M35 runs from East 126th to East 124th Streets, changing direction from Harlem to Randall's Island at East 125th Street.
- The M98 runs from East 120th to East 65th Streets.
- The M101, M102 and M103 (Third and Lexington Avenues Line) run to East 24th Street from Dr. Martin Luther King Jr. Boulevard, East 116th Street and East 126th Street, respectively.
- The BxM1 runs from East 106th to East 34th Streets.
- The SIM6 and SIM11 run from East 57th to East 23rd Streets.
- The SIM22 and SIM26 run from East 57th to East 42nd Streets.

The IRT Lexington Avenue Line (4, 5, 6, and <6> trains) of the New York City Subway runs under Lexington Avenue north of 42nd Street (at Grand Central–42nd Street station) to 125th Street. South of Grand Central, this subway line runs under Park Avenue, Park Avenue South, and Fourth Avenue until Astor Place. The line interchanges with the IND Queens Boulevard Line (E, F, and <F> trains) at Lexington Avenue/51st Street station and with the BMT Broadway Line (N, Q, R, and W trains) at Lexington Avenue/59th Street station. Irving Place is located near 14th Street–Union Square station, served by the Lexington, Broadway, and BMT Canarsie Lines (4, 5, 6, <6>, L, N, Q, R, and W trains). The Lexington Avenue–63rd Street station of the IND and BMT 63rd Street Lines (M and Q trains) is also located at Lexington Avenue, but it does not have a direct interchange with the Lexington Avenue Line.

== In popular culture ==
Lexington Avenue became part of a classic American cinematic moment in the 1955 movie The Seven Year Itch in which Marilyn Monroe shot what would become her most famous scene. While standing on a subway grating outside the Loew's Lexington Theatre, her skirt billowed up from the wind underneath. While the footage showing the theatre in the background appeared in the finished film, the footage featuring the subway grate shot on September 15, 1954, on the corner of Lexington Avenue and 51st Street, was more of a publicity stunt; retakes were shot on a studio soundstage, and shots from both are seen in the film.

== See also ==
- Lexington Avenue bombing
- Southern Indian Cuisine: in reference to the growing number of Asian Indian restaurants and spice shops along a stretch of Lexington Avenue between 25th and 30th Streets in the Rose Hill neighborhood which has become known as Curry Hill.
