= Bar Works =

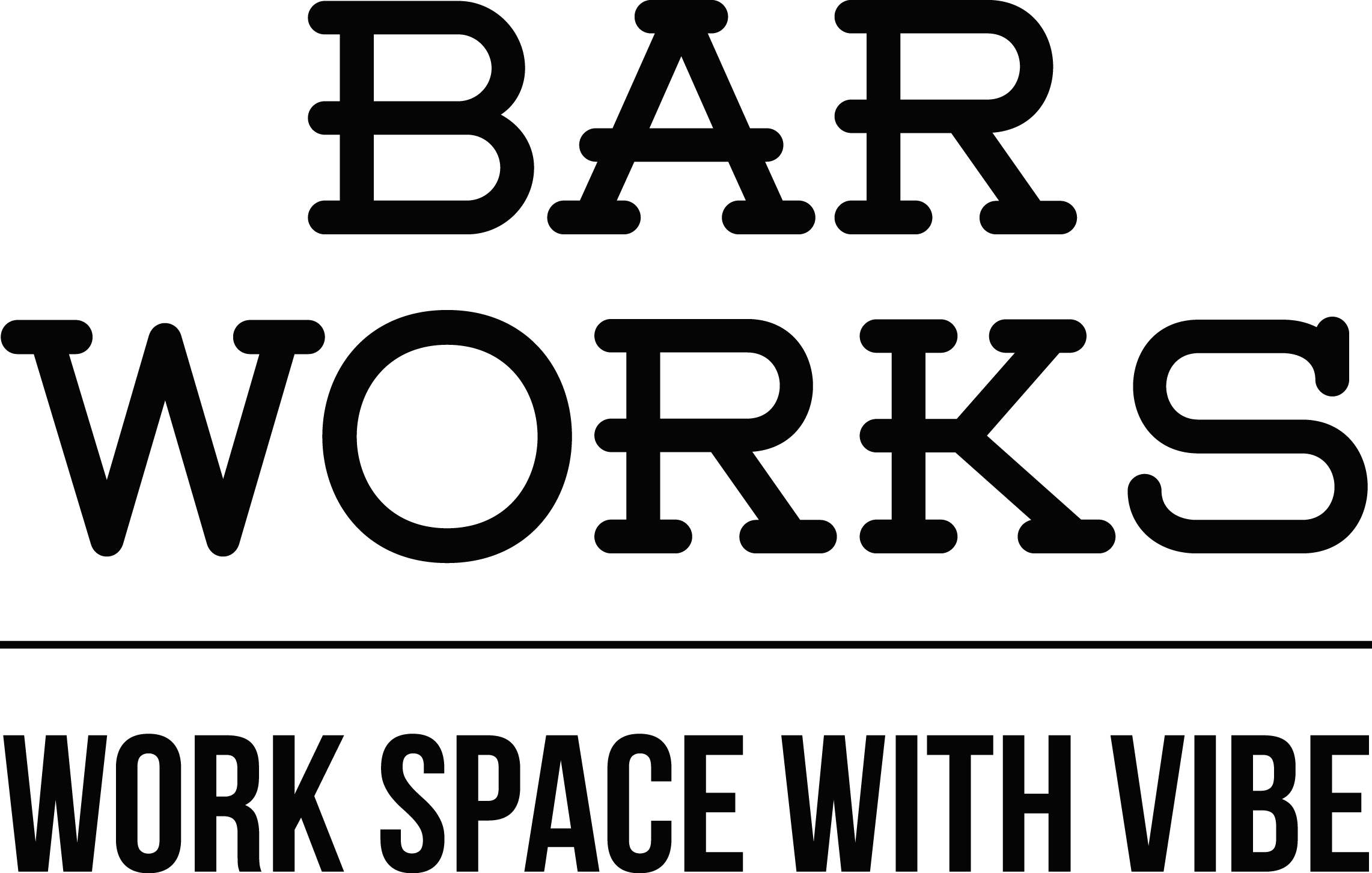
- Founded: 2015
- Headquarters: 47W 39TH St, New York, USA (Closed June 2017)
- Services: Coworking space, Shared office, Virtual office
- Website: barworks.nyc (defunct), barworks.us (defunct)

Bar Works was a New York City company that provided shared office space in a former bar and restaurant premises. For $25,000, investors could buy desks at Bar Works locations and then lease them back to the company. It has been noted that elements of the investment program are akin to a Ponzi scheme.

Bar Works is now defunct and its founder, Renwick Haddow, has been arrested and charged.

== Locations ==
The first Bar Works venue, at 47 West 39th Street, was opened at the end of October 2015 and had 200 work units, plus meeting and networking areas. Though superficially a shared office space, the venue was dependent on the coffee bar operating inside for revenue. Following the coffee bar's decision to pull out of the space, Bar Works announced in June 2017 that the location would be shutting down due to difficulties in otherwise generating business.

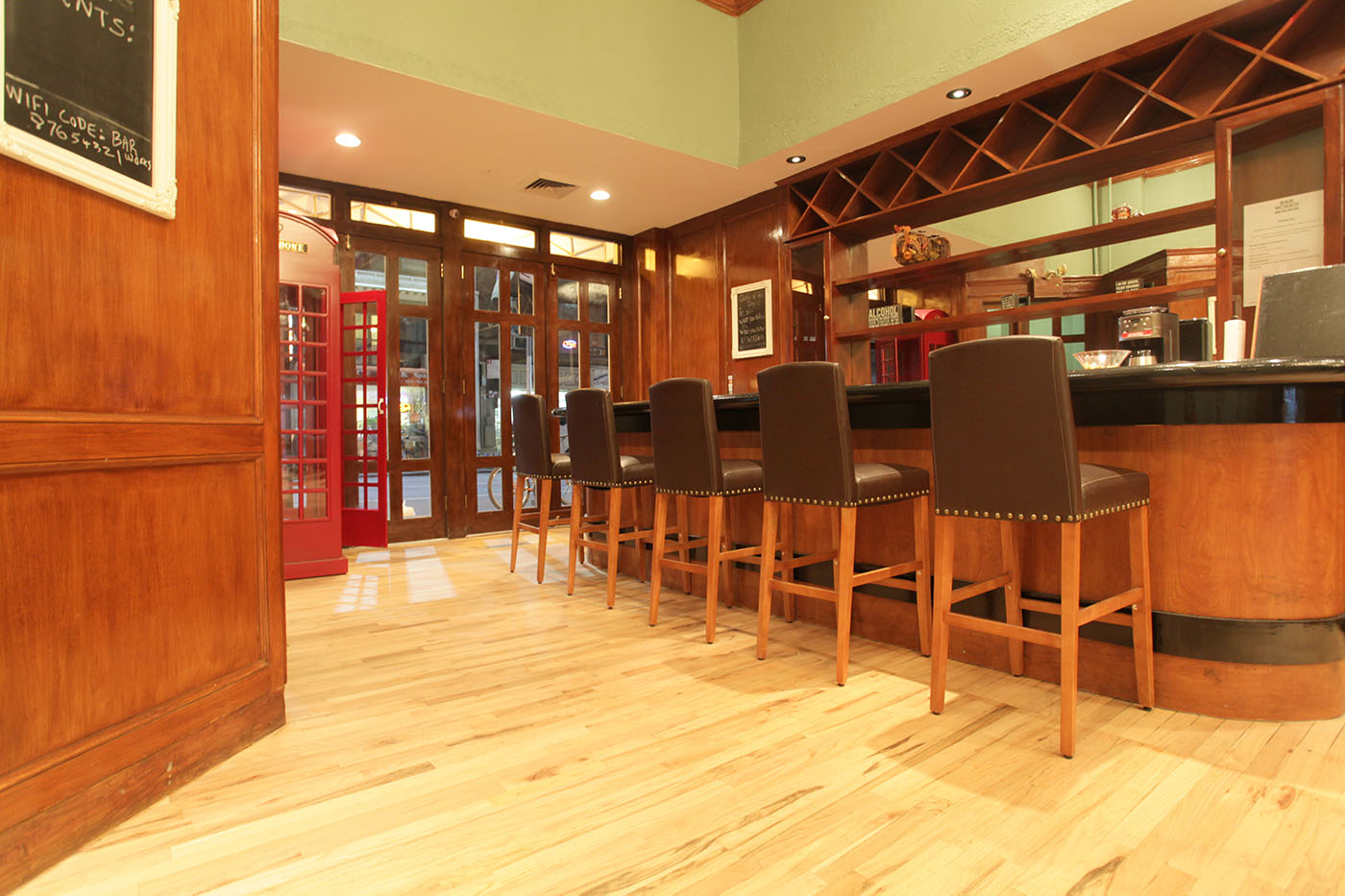
Barworks 47 West 39th St

The second location in Manhattan’s Times Square opened for business in February 2016. The Times Square space occupied 4,500 square foot with a capacity for 300 people. It shut down in early 2017 following difficulties attracting a steady client base.

In June 2016, Bar Works announced plans to open a 6,000 sq ft co-working space at Jack's Restaurant in San Francisco after acquiring the freehold to the second oldest restaurant in the city. In May 2017 it was announced that the building would be converted from a co-working space into a restaurant unaffiliated with Bar Works. In January 2017, Bar Works also attempted to open a location in Wynwood, Miami. All the physical infrastructure was finished, including three large murals on the building, before it closed down within two months of opening.

== Bar Works Investment ==
Bar Works sold workspaces to investors, starting at $25,000 each. The investors then leased the spaces back to Bar Works for a period of 10 years. The leaseback investment offers guaranteed returns of 14% per annum. In response to skepticism of such high guaranteed returns over such a long period of time, Bar Works hired unnamed auditors to review the company, who described the business model as "bomb-proof".

== Payment problems and legal issues ==
In April 2017 Bar Works issued a statement to investors describing "difficulties with its banking facilities", alluding to disruptions in investment returns in the foreseeable future.

In May 2017 Bar Works issued a statement to investors informing them that their monthly lease payments would again be delayed due to "productive restructuring". CEO Franklin Kinard told investors later in the month that he believed payments would resume after June 1. In order to reassure investors that Bar Works workspaces are operating and not empty, Kinard also described the company's efforts to provide "video feeds of the activity in our buildings", an uncommon practice in the shared workspace industry. Kinard resigned from his position and left Bar Works before the end of May 2017.

Shortly after Kinard's resignation from Bar Works, Brad Fiorilla became the Director of Sales. Fiorilla was previously general manager of UFC Gym in Brighton Beach, New York.

Though monthly lease payments remained suspended into June 2017 and locations continued to shut down, Bar Works announced it was opening two new venues in New York's Tribeca district, and Los Angeles' Hollywood. Before the end of the month, the Tribeca location's signage had been removed, and a juice bar was operating out of the space.

On June 16, 2017, 27 investors from the People's Republic of China who had invested over $3 million in the Bar Works companies filed suit in New York County Supreme Court. They claimed that the companies were a Ponzi Scheme orchestrated by Renwick Haddow, who kept his controlling role in the company hidden. The Chinese investors also claimed that Bar Works defaulted almost immediately on its payment commitments and that it fraudulently solicited investments in locations that it never planned to open.

On June 21, 2017 a second lawsuit was filed against the company by Plentium Capital Group Corporation in Florida Federal court. The plaintiffs claimed that $25 million of raised funds were immediately defaulted upon, and that management links to prior Ponzi schemes were hidden from marketing materials.

On June 30, 2017, the U.S. Securities and Exchange Commission filed fraud charges against Haddow, "the clandestine founder of a purported Bitcoin platform and a chain of co-working spaces located in former bars and restaurants, alleging that he bilked investors in both companies while hiding his connection given his checkered past with regulators in the U.K."

On 25 July 2017, Haddow was arrested attempting to enter Morocco. On 13 April 2018, he was extradited to the US where he is facing charges related to Bar Works as well as Bitcoin Store, another allegedly fraudulent operation. Each charge carries a maximum 20-year prison sentence.
