= Pete's Tavern =

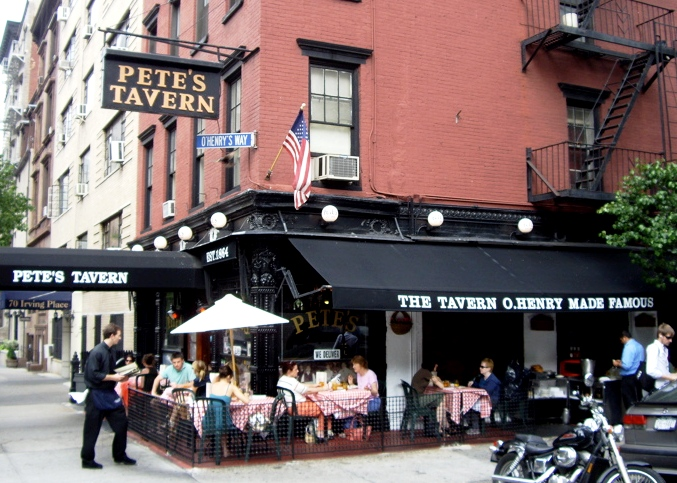
- Pete's Tavern in 2007
- Interactive map of Pete's Tavern

Restaurant information
- Food type: American, Italian
- Dress code: casual
- Location: 129 East 18th Street (at the corner of Irving Place) in Gramercy Park, Manhattan, New York City, New York, 10003, United States
- Coordinates: 40.73653°N 73.986746°W
- Website: https://www.petestavern.com

Pete's Tavern, located at 129 East 18th Street on the corner of Irving Place in the Gramercy Park neighborhood of Manhattan, New York City, is a pub food restaurant and the oldest continuously operating restaurant and bar in New York City.

== History ==
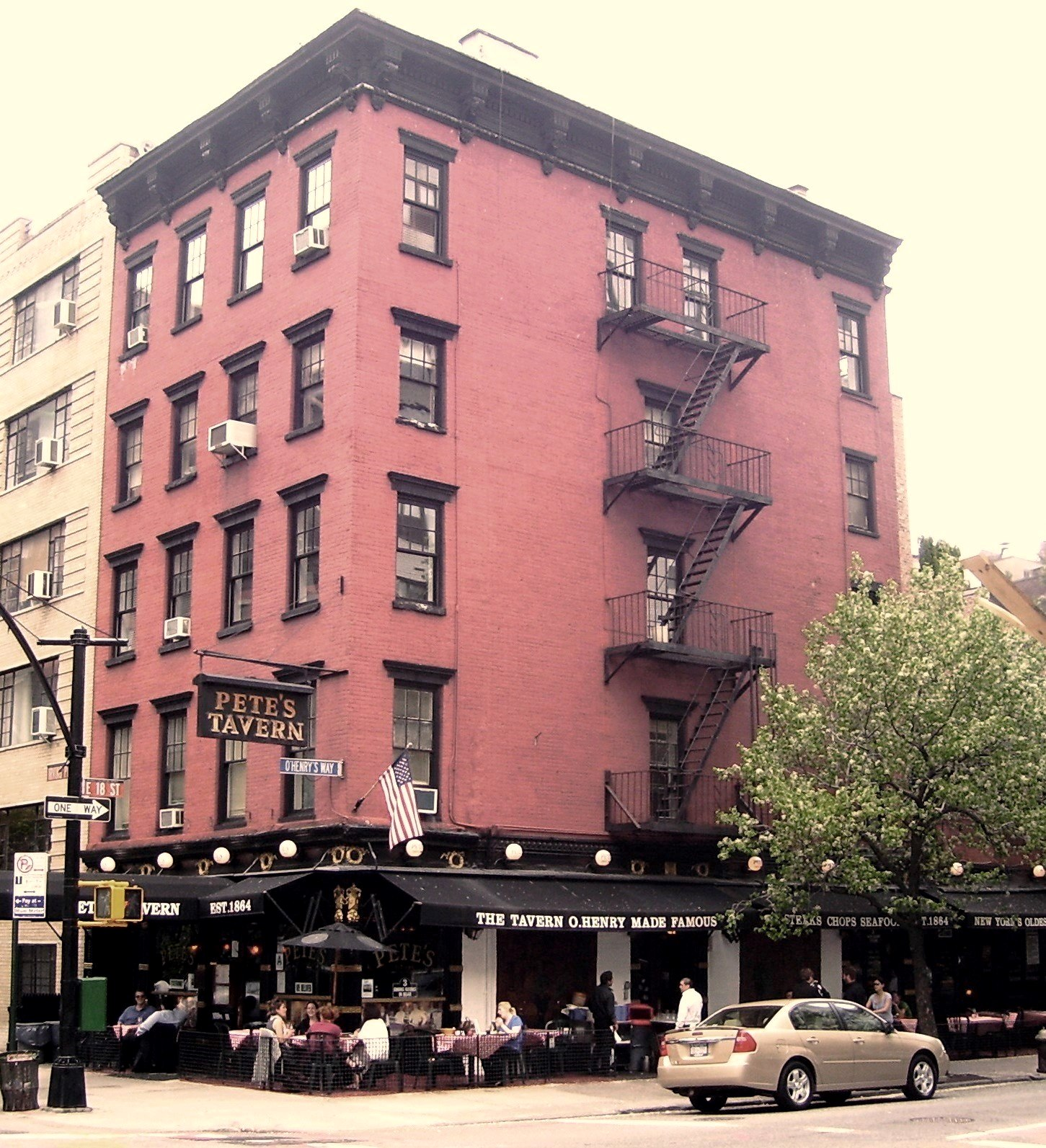
The building that houses Pete's Tavern was built in 1829 as the Portman Hotel

The building that houses Pete's was built in 1829, and was originally the Portman Hotel; liquor may have been sold there as early as 1851 or 1852 – when it was a "grocery & grog" store – and the first official drinking establishment founded by 1864. It was bought in 1899 by Tom and John Healy, and became Healy's. During prohibition, when selling alcohol was illegal, the bar continued to operate disguised as a flower shop.

The writer O. Henry lived down the street at 55 Irving Place from 1903 to 1907, and Healy's appears in his short story "The Lost Blend" under the name "Kenealy's". Local legend also has it that he wrote his well-known story "The Gift of the Magi" in Healy's second booth from the front, but this appears to be apocryphal.

The present name dates to the purchase of the establishment by Peter D'Belles in 1926.

Although the tavern claims to be "an official historical landmark", it is neither a designated New York City landmark nor is it on the National Register of Historic Places. It does, however, lie within the Gramercy Park Historic District designated by the New York City Landmarks Preservation Commission in 1966. Gary Egan is proprietor of Pete's Tavern and has been General Manager of the restaurant for over 30 years.

== In popular culture ==
Pete's Tavern has appeared in numerous films and television programs, including Two for the Seesaw, Seinfeld, Ragtime, Endless Love, Law & Order, Nurse Jackie, Spin City, Sex and the City, Across the Sea of Time, The Guru, Blue Bloods, The Blacklist, and more recently, Fleishman is in Trouble. It has also been used as a location for television commercials such as Miller Lite ads with Ben Davidson and Tony Esposito, as well as print advertisements.

== See also ==
- List of the oldest restaurants in the United States
- List of restaurants in New York City
