= Wolfsbane (restaurant) =

Restaurant in San Francisco, California, U.S.

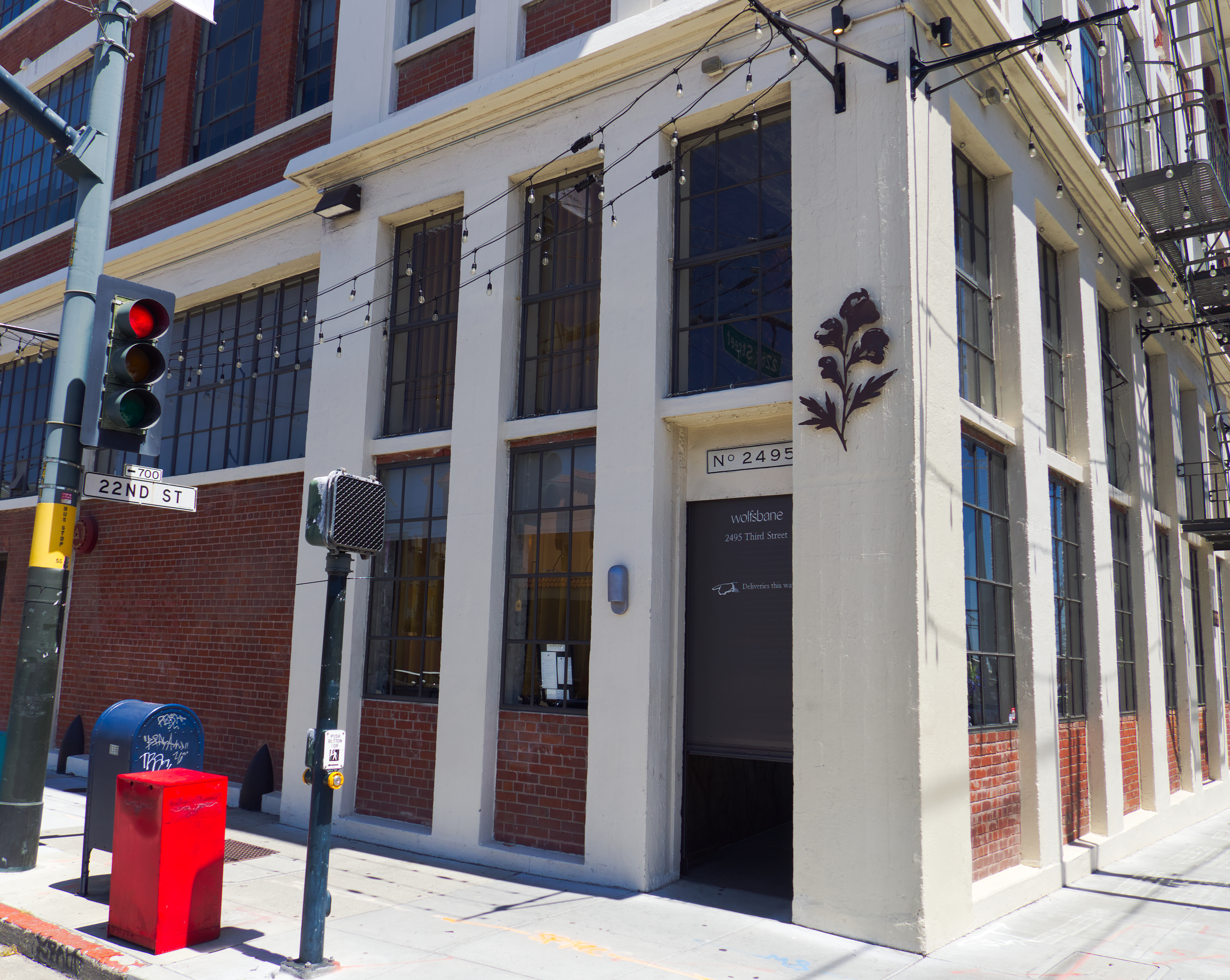
- Wolfsbane's exterior in July 2026
- Interactive map of Wolfsbane

Restaurant information
- Established: October 2025
- Owners: Rupert and Carrie Blease, Tommy Halvorson
- Manager: Carrie Blease
- Head chef: Rupert Blease
- Food type: Contemporary Californian
- Rating: (Michelin Guide)
- Location: 2495 3rd Street, San Francisco, California, 94107, United States
- Coordinates: 37.7581°N 122.3881°W
- Seating capacity: 75
- Reservations: Required for dining rooms
- Website: wolfsbanesf.com

Wolfsbane is a Michelin-starred restaurant in the Dogpatch neighborhood of San Francisco, California, United States. It opened in 2025 and is co-owned by Rupert and Carrie Blease, the former owners of Lord Stanley, and Tommy Halvorson, the former owner of Serpentine, which was at the location now occupied by Wolfsbane.

== History ==
Rupert and Carrie Blease, the former owners of Lord Stanley, which closed in 2024, and Tommy Halvorson, a caterer who owned the brunch restaurant Serpentine from 2017 until its closure in 2020, announced in July 2025 that they would open Wolfsbane at Serpentine's former location in Dogpatch. The restaurant opened in mid-October. In June 2026, it was awarded a Michelin star.

== Description ==
Wolfsbane is one of the first fine-dining restaurants to open in Dogpatch, a formerly blue-collar neighborhood of San Francisco with primarily casual dining. It occupies what was the boiler room of an American Can Company factory. The space had been operated as a restaurant until 2020, but was redesigned by Seth Boor; the interior features a large amount of greenery including large branches, chairs covered in green velvet, and handmade Japanese-style lanterns.

The restaurant serves a 9- or 10-course seasonal tasting menu in the dining room, and has à la carte options available in the bar area, which does not require reservations. The space has also been expanded with a private dining room, where the owners planned to host visiting chefs. Carrie Blease is the general manager and Rupert Blease the head chef. Carrie Blease described the food at Wolfsbane as "modern European with California ingredients"; the Michelin Guide characterizes it as "contemporary Californian cuisine, cleverly accented with Nordic, Japanese and French elements". Some of the dishes are derived from menu items at the Bleases' previous restaurant, Lord Stanley; a sourdough-based pain-au-jus is based on a snack the staff used to share after closing. The beverage offerings emphasize California natural wines as well as rare bourbons sourced by Halvorson.

== Reception ==
The San Francisco Chronicle listed Wolfsbane in September 2025 as one of the most anticipated restaurant openings in the Bay Area, and after its opening as one of the most beautiful new restaurants of the year and as one of the best. It was included in the newspaper's 2026 list of the hundred best restaurants in the Bay Area. A reviewer from Eater found it "relaxed and not too buttoned up", unlike many fine dining restaurants, and the initial review in the Chronicle judged it to be worth the high price of the tasting menu and also praised the pastry offerings. The reviewer for the San Francisco Standard was less sure, but noted that "presentations are fun — even theatrical" and that only one dish was unsuccessful.

== See also ==
- List of Michelin-starred restaurants in California
