= Tivoli Bar and Grill =

Bar in San Diego, California, U.S.

Coordinates: 32°42′38″N 117°9′32.3″W

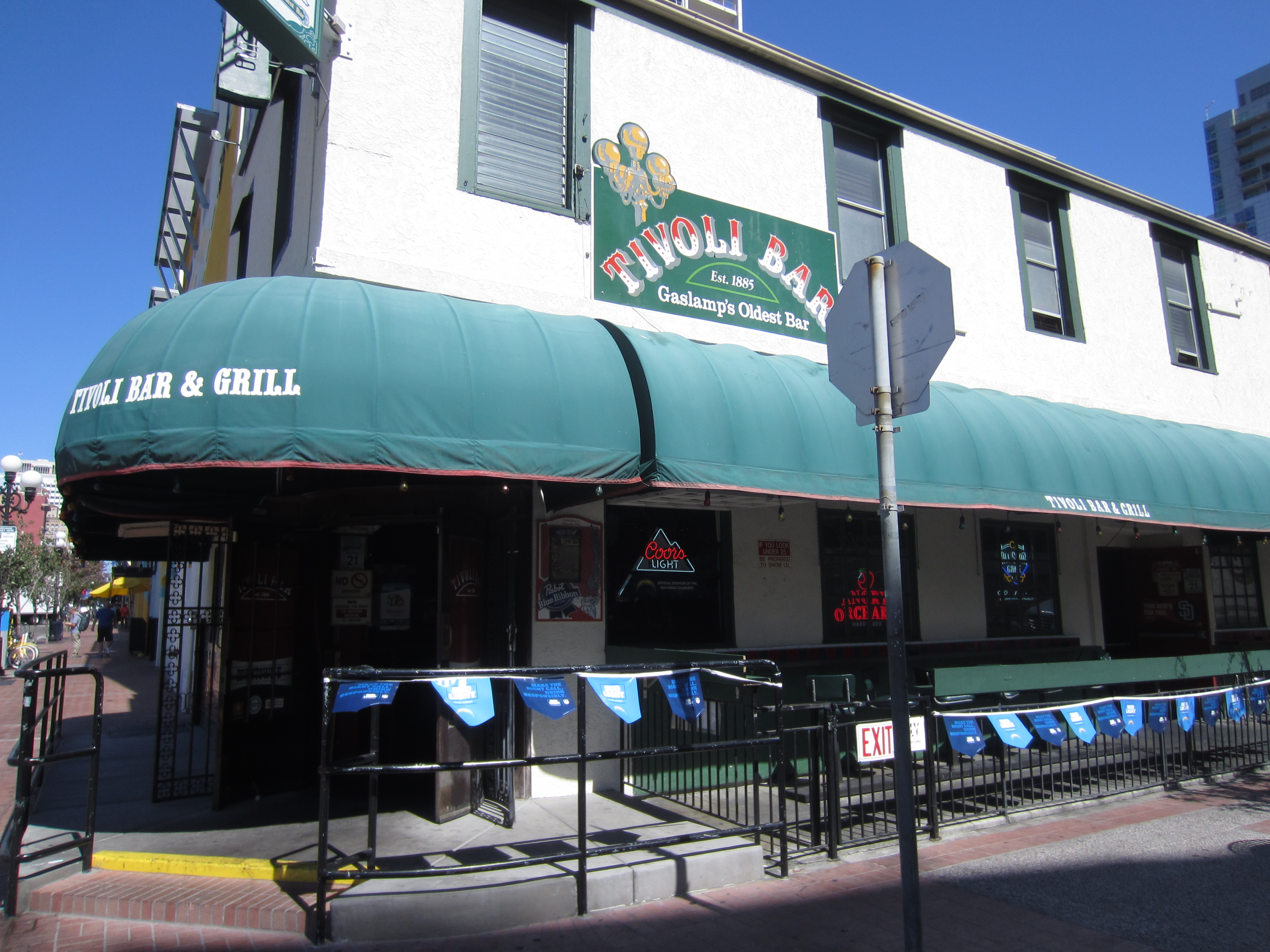
- Interactive map of Tivoli Bar and Grill

Restaurant information
- Location: San Diego, California, United States

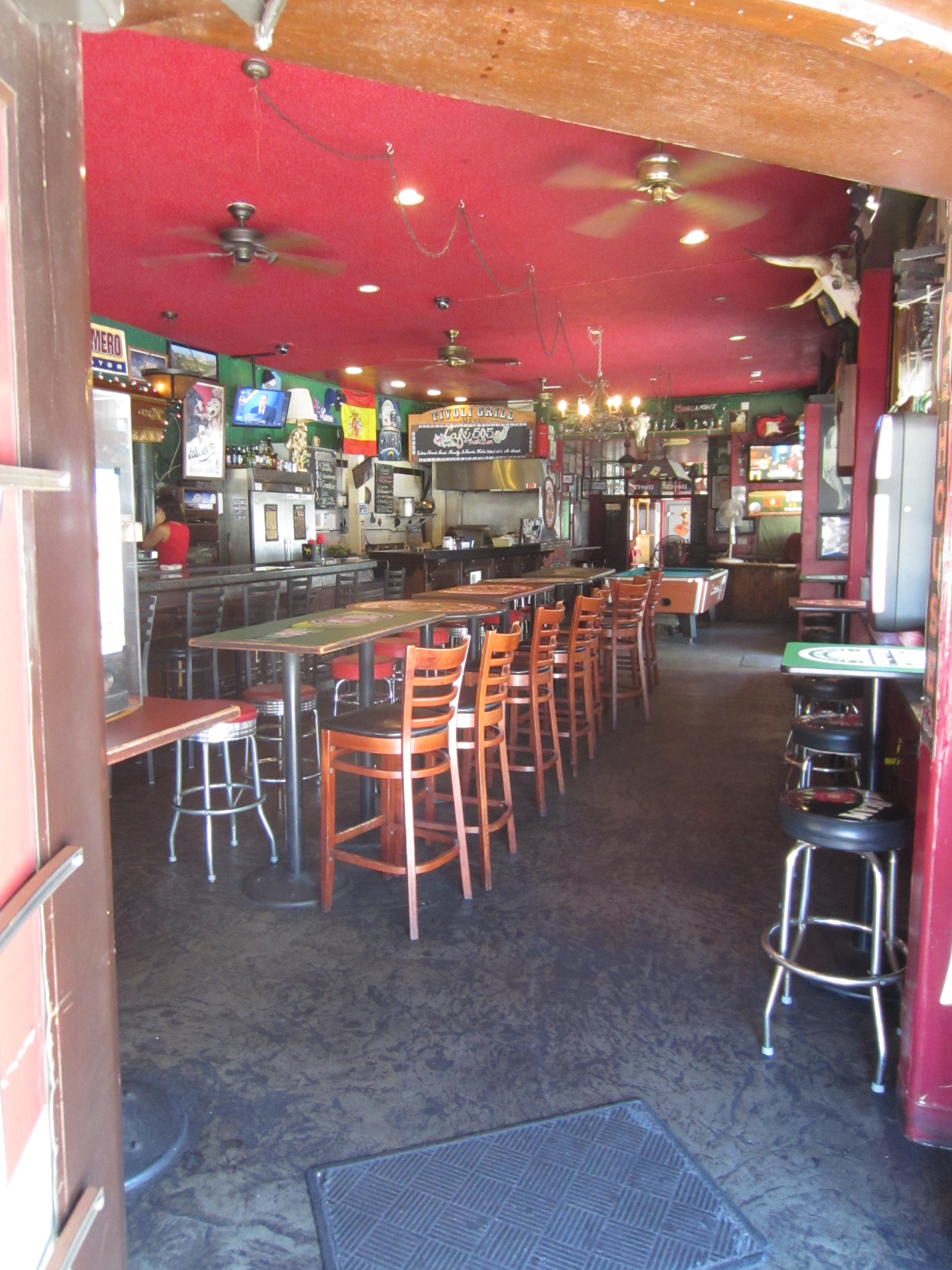
The bar's interior, 2016

Tivoli Bar and Grill is the oldest bar in San Diego, California, located at 505 Sixth Ave. in the Gaslamp Quarter. It opened as a saloon in 1885.

Between 1872 and 1885, the building housed a boarding house, a feed store, and a blacksmith shop, and the nine apartments above the bar were once used as a brothel.

The bar retains its original wooden bar and back bar, and the first cash register to be installed is still on display. Wyatt Earp was once a regular at the bar.
