= Tadich Grill =

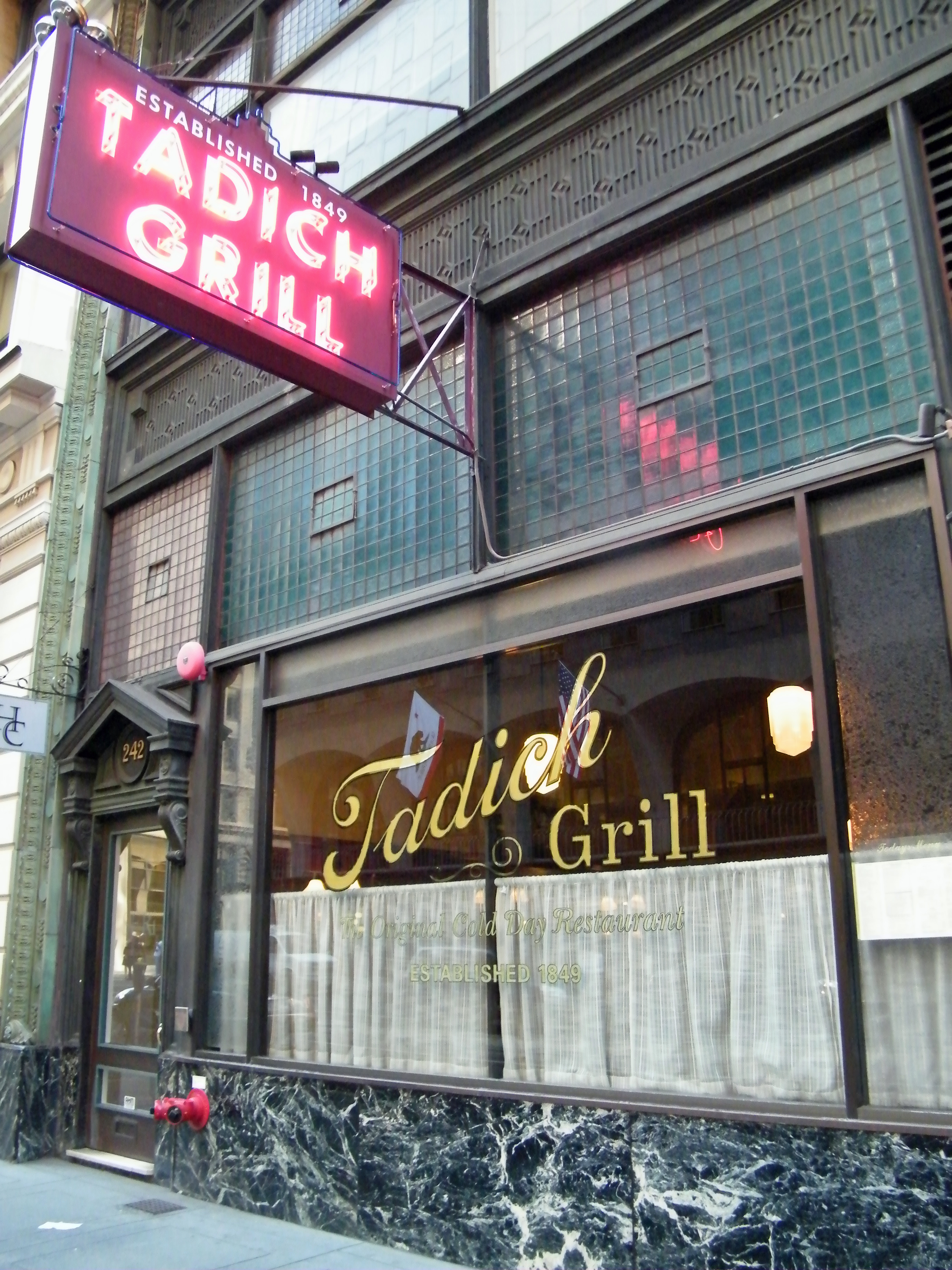
- Interactive map of Tadich Grill

Restaurant information
- Established: 1849; 177 years ago
- Owner: Buich family
- Previous owner: John Tadich
- Head chef: Jeffery Rodriguez
- Location: 240 California Street, San Francisco, California, 94111
- Coordinates: 37.7934°N 122.3993°W
- Seating capacity: 100
- Website: www.tadichgrillsf.com

The Tadich Grill is an American seafood restaurant located in San Francisco, California. Founded in 1849, it is the oldest running restaurant in California. Based in the Financial District, the restaurant is located at 240 California Street. The dining experience features Croatian-style cooking techniques that include grilling seafood over mesquite and charcoal broilers for varying flavor profiles and uniform broiling.

== History ==
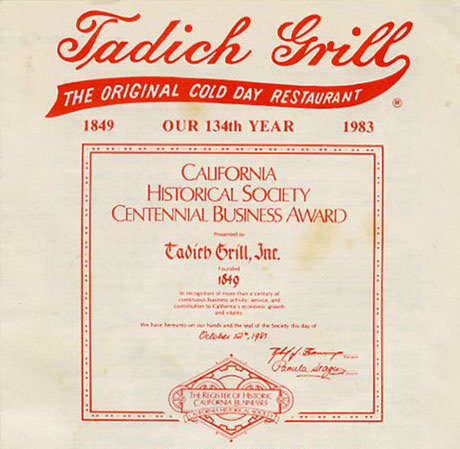
Menu, Tadich Grill, San Francisco 1983

The original restaurant opened in 1849 as a coffee stand on Clay Street in San Francisco, California. It was founded by Nikola Budrovich, Frano Kosta, and Antonio Gasparich, three immigrants from Croatia, who launched their restaurant as "Coffee Stand". The establishment was renamed "New World Coffee Stand", following a move to the New World Market, a local market place in San Francisco.

In 1887, their restaurant was purchased by and renamed after John Tadich, a Croatian from Stari Grad on the Island of Hvar. In 1928, Tadich sold the restaurant to another Croatian family, the Buichs. In 1967, the restaurant moved to its present location at 240 California Street; this was after Wells Fargo bought the Clay Street location for redevelopment. The current space is one-third larger than the original, and the Buiches worked with contractors to recreate the Art Deco interior design that the Clay Street space had. All of the moldings and woodwork were copied, and the original Clay Street bar was moved to the present location. The restaurant reopened within one month of moving.

In 1925, Louis Buich implemented Croatian-style cooking at the Tadich grill, requiring chefs to use a mesquite broiler for cooking seafood. The restaurant's use of the grilling technique became popular, and in a single day the restaurant can go through four 40-pound (18 kg) bags of mesquite charcoal. Little has changed in regards to the restaurant's cooking methods, and the restaurant has had only seven chefs since 1925 (as of 2011). After operating at several locations in the previous century, the restaurant's last move in 1967 was to a location on the California Street cable car line.

In 1999, R.W. Apple called the restaurant, "old-fashioned, a nostalgic shrine to local piscine tradition." According to Apple, the restaurant's best known dish is cioppino, a seafood soup created in San Francisco, and other California seafood specialities like Petrale sole and sand dabs. Herb Caen, longtime columnist of the San Francisco Chronicle, was a fan of Tadich's version of the Hangtown Fry, a Gold Rush era combination of scrambled eggs, bacon and oysters. In The New York Times, Sadie Stein wrote in 2013 that the restaurant is "Festive without being stuffy, it offers a taste of the San Francisco of yore while embracing the present day." The restaurant operated a branch in Washington, D.C. from 2015 to 2018.

== Cuisine ==
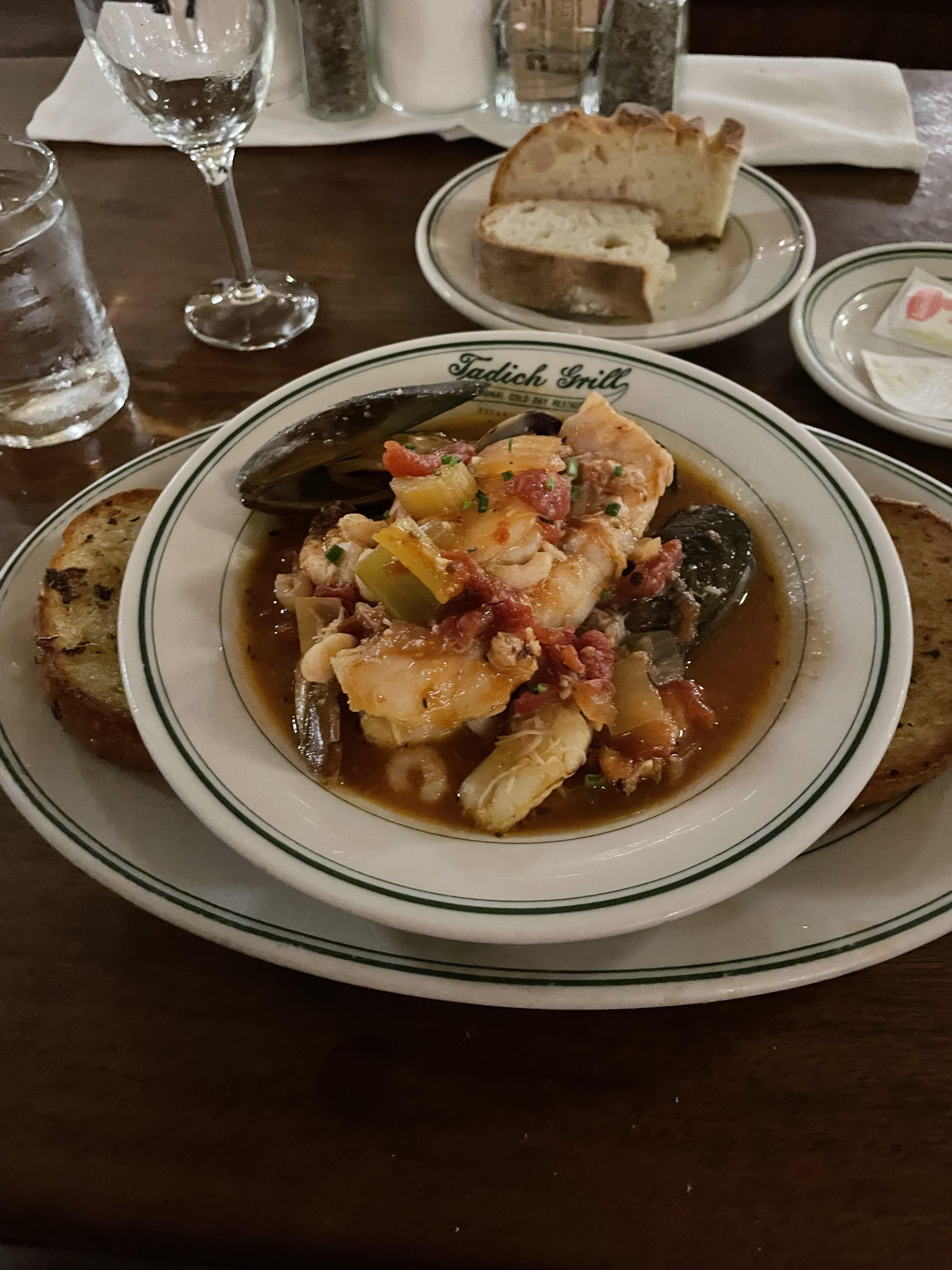
Cioppino

The menu focuses on traditional seafood, stews, and casseroles. Ingredients are locally sourced, including seafood such as Dungeness crab and sand dab. The restaurant also offers a day-of-the-week menu, which has remained unchanged for many years. Items on the day-of-the-week menu include lamb roast on Mondays, beef tongue on Tuesdays, and corned beef and cabbage on Thursdays. Oysters are also a major feature on the menu and most, if not all, menu items are prepared in restaurant. Prawns are the only frozen fish at the restaurant, and the Tadich actively avoids selling fish that is overfished, limiting sales of fish such as sea bass.

== Cooking style ==
The Tadich Grill employs traditional Croatian-style cooking methods to prepare, cook, and present their seafood and meats. The restaurant grills seafood over mesquite broilers and charcoal, a common practice throughout Dalmatia and the island cities of Croatia.

== Staff ==
The restaurant and its waitstaff are styled after a European bistro. Waiters wear white jackets and black pants, and tend to be middle- to older-aged. The restaurant, previously first come, first served, now takes reservations for half of the seating, the remaining half is available on a first come, first serve basis. On average, the restaurant serves 700 meals a day.

== See also ==
- Croatian cuisine
- History of seafood cuisine
- List of James Beard America's Classics
- List of seafood restaurants
- List of the oldest restaurants in the United States
