= Lord Stanley (restaurant) =

Restaurant in San Francisco, California, U.S.

- Interactive map of Lord Stanley

Restaurant information
- Established: June 11, 2015
- Closed: May 31, 2025
- Owners: Rupert and Carrie Blease
- Chef: Nathan Matkowsky
- Food type: European; French
- Location: 2065 Polk Street, San Francisco, California, 94109, United States
- Coordinates: 37°47′45″N 122°25′19″W
- Seating capacity: 52 (main room 40)
- Website: lordstanleysf.com

Lord Stanley was a restaurant in the Russian Hill neighborhood of San Francisco, California, serving European cuisine with a later emphasis on French cuisine. Opened in 2015 by the husband and wife chef team of Rupert and Carrie Blease, it held a Michelin star from 2015 until 2021, when it closed during the COVID-19 pandemic. The premises then hosted a series of chef pop-ups, Turntable by Lord Stanley, until 2023, when Lord Stanley was reopened. It closed permanently on May 31, 2025.

== History ==
Lord Stanley opened on June 11, 2015, the first ownership venture by Rupert and Carrie Blease, a married couple of chefs. It was awarded a Michelin star that October, and in August 2016 Bon Appétit magazine named it that year's third-best new restaurant.

The restaurant retained its Michelin star for the next four years. In response to the limitations on restaurants during the COVID-19 pandemic, the Bleases and chef Brandon Jew jointly opened a take-out restaurant, Lord Jiu's, and Lord Stanley sold take-out meal kits and wine. In early September 2021, Lord Stanley was closed and reopened as Turntable at Lord Stanley, hosting visiting and up-and-coming chefs for a few months each, the first being Argentinian chef Narda Lepes.

Lord Stanley reopened in October 2023, with Nathan Matkowsky, the chef de cuisine, becoming chef, and the Turntable at Lord Stanley pop-ups continuing elsewhere. In early March 2025, the owners announced that Matkowsky was resigning to relocate to the East Coast and Lord Stanley would close permanently after May 31, 2025.

== Restaurant ==
Located in a former Thai restaurant in Polk Gulch in the Russian Hill neighborhood of San Francisco and named for the owners' local London pub, Lord Stanley was designed by Boor Bridges Architecture and Upcycle Builders and is predominantly steel and concrete, with floor-to-ceiling windows and wooden tables. The walls are painted white and grey; in 2015 a San Francisco Chronicle review described the restaurant's look as "modern and minimal, but with a finished edge." The main dining area seats 40, with a communal table seating 12 in an overlooking mezzanine.

The cuisine was initially modern European with California accents. Its entry in the Michelin Guide described Lord Stanley as "half European and half Californian", with "approachable yet refined" cooking. The restaurant offers a tasting and an à la carte menu, with gratuities included in the price on the European model. When it reopened in 2023, the menu focused on French cuisine with Asian touches; the Chronicle later described it as a "modern bistro".

Reviewers praised the creative use of vegetables. In 2016, the Chronicle's restaurant critic, Michael Bauer, judged Lord Stanley "a very good restaurant [that] has evolved into one of the most interesting restaurants in the city." In 2020, the newspaper described it as one of the more modestly priced Michelin-starred restaurants in the city.

== See also ==
- List of defunct restaurants of the United States
- List of Michelin-starred restaurants in California
