= Charbroiler =

Cooking device

- Classification: Cooking equipment
- Industry: Various
- Application: Cooking
- Fuel source: Natural gas, Propane

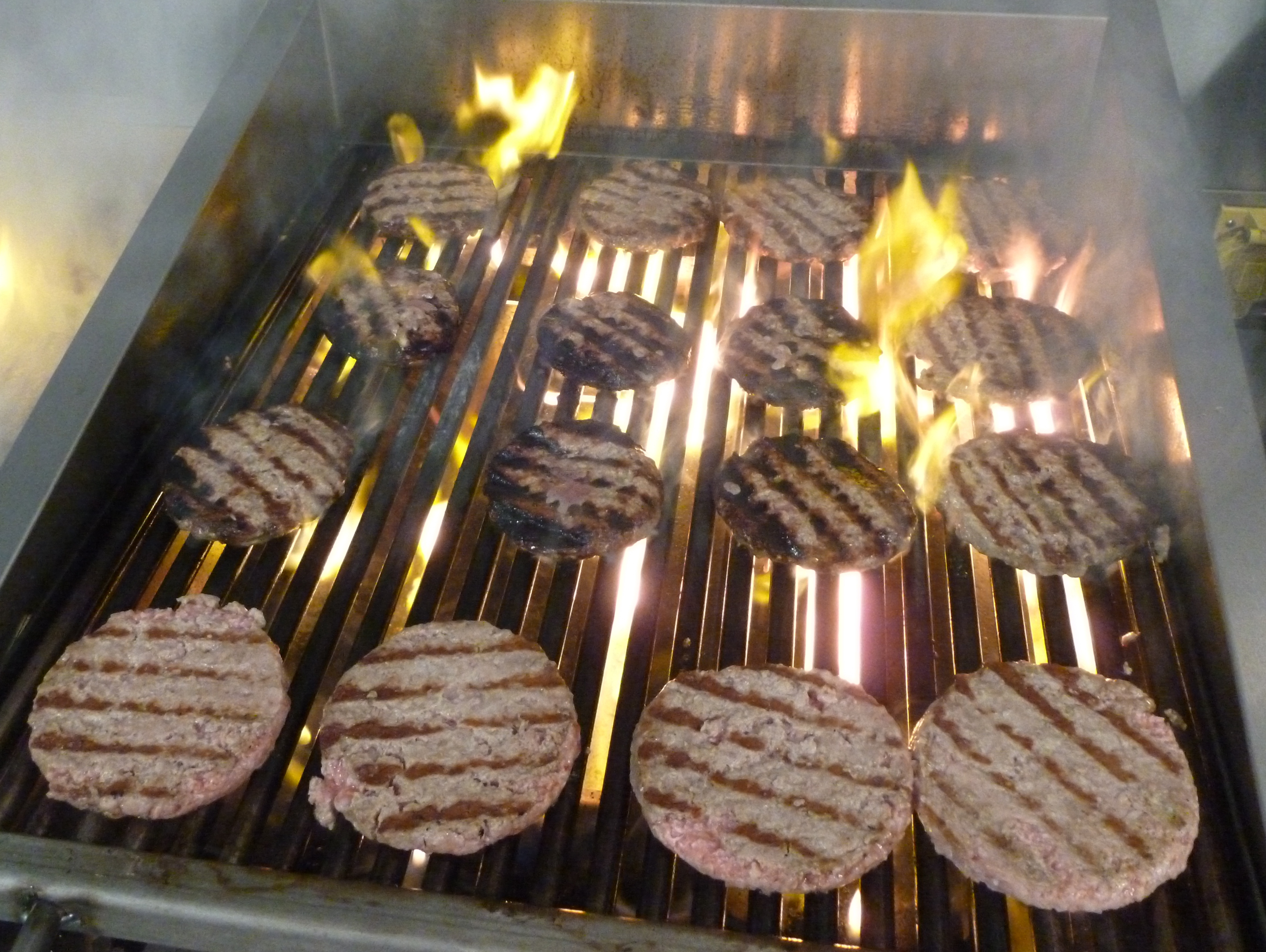
Hamburgers cooking on a charbroiler

A charbroiler (also referred to as a chargrill, char-broiler or simply broiler) is a commonly used cooking device consisting of a series of grates or ribs that can be heated using a variety of means, and is used in both residential and commercial applications for an assortment of cooking operations. The heat source is almost always beneath the cooking surface and for gas-fired applications this is referred to as an under-fired broiler. Most commonly the charbroiler is a series of long evenly spaced metal ribs over a large combustion chamber filled with an array of burners that may have a deflector, briquettes or radiant between the burner and the cooking surface.

The term charbroiler is usually associated with commercial kitchen applications, though the construction and cooking process is similar to light-duty residential products referred to as grills. The terms charbroiling, broiling, grilling and char-grilling are often used interchangeably, though depending on the application and equipment involved there may be differences in how the food product is actually cooked. The Culinary Reference Guide identifies grilling as "the process used when an item is cooked on a grated surface to sear in the flavors and impart a degree of charring which gives the product a light charcoal smoke flavor."

== Principles ==
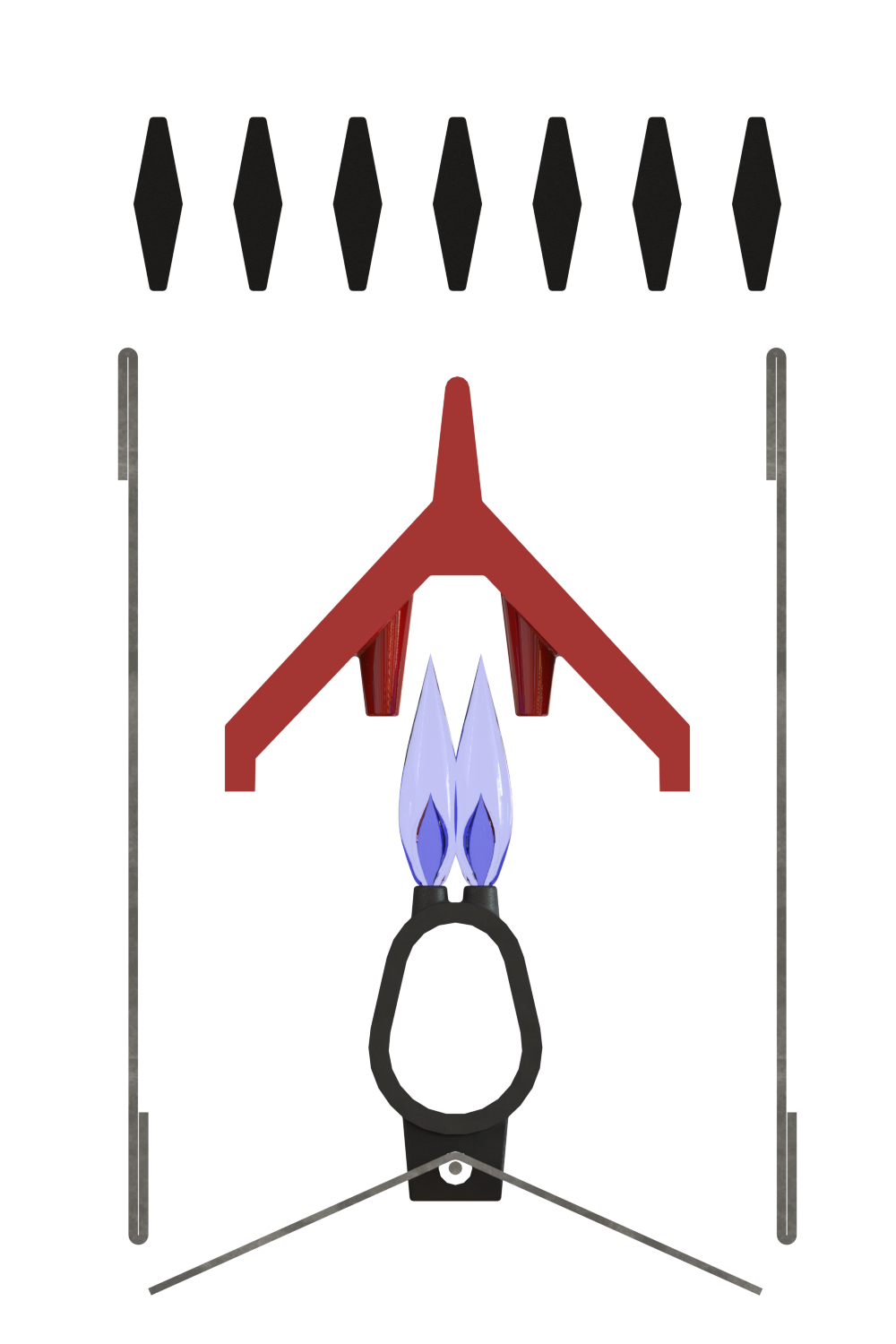
Charbroiler burner – straight cast, radiant, grate & supercharger plates

Charbroilers may be either free-standing countertop equipment that sits on a stand or refrigerated base, or part of a larger piece of equipment such as a restaurant range. Nominal unit width (left-to-right) sizes are in increments of 12 in (305 mm), most commonly 24 to 72 in (610 to 1,829 mm). Typical commercial charbroilers are a system of three main characteristics: (1) burner, (2) radiant, and (3) grate. The various combinations of these individual aspects have a dramatic effect on the performance of the charbroiler, though other design features such as gas orifice sizing, under-burner heat deflectors, burner divider plates (also known as "superchargers") are also added to create unique and improved performance characteristics.

Under-fired charbroilers heat food products according to the three primary modes of heat transfer: 1) convection, 2) conduction and 3) radiation (infrared). Performance is defined by such aspects as time to heat, temperature consistency/evenness, recovery time, and productivity (pounds of food per hour for example). Most charbroilers have very pronounced 'hot' and 'cold' zones that are a function of the main system characteristics vary based on unit size and other aspects of construction. These temperature zones may vary between manufacturers, and change over time as the broiler components wear-in or fail. Certain commercial charbroiler products are designed to cook using only infrared energy, with a wide range of benefits to the charbroiled cooking process.

Gas charbroilers are recognized to have among the highest energy consumption rates of commercial cooking equipment. Selecting a product to meet both menu and branding needs should be balanced against usable cooking space, productivity and energy efficiency, to the degree this is possible.

== Heating characteristics ==
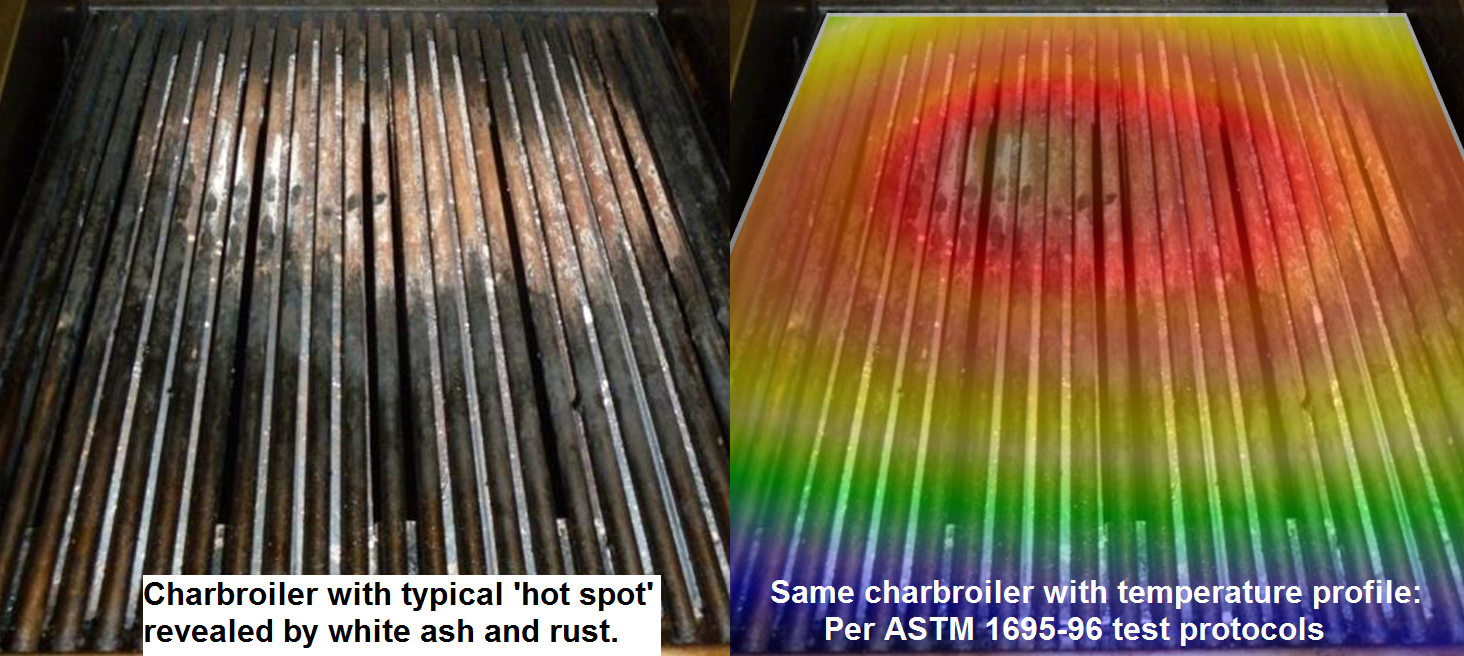
Results of the plume effect in a common commercial charbroiler

Surface temperatures are evaluated using a test methodology defined in ASTM Standard F2835-10.

Charbroilers are not generally known for consistent cooking surface temperatures, which can vary by up to 400 °F (204 °C) between maximum and minimum. This large temperature differential is driven by the tendency of the burner array to create a heat plume which draws convective heat toward the center of the broiler and tends to leave the outer perimeter cooler than the interior. The elevated heat pattern from this plume effect is generally predictable and visible on the grates themselves. Temperatures well above 700 °F (371 °C) will incinerate the oils left on the grates by normal cooking processes, leaving a discernible white ash that tends to define the hottest areas.

== Construction ==
Typical charbroiler construction involves each of the three main characteristics of a commercial charbroiler (burner, radiant and grate) and can have a range of aspects that affect the performance of the overall unit. However, the design of any charbroiler follows the same basic functional requirements: large, flat, heated ribbed surface on which to cook food with dry heat.

Charbroiler grilling is defined as "the process used when an item is cooked on a grated surface to sear in the flavors and impart a degree of charring which gives the product a light charcoal smoke flavor." Charbroiling will expose food to temperatures often in excess of 260 °C (500 °F). Grilled meat acquires a distinctive roast aroma from a chemical process called the Maillard reaction. The Maillard reaction only occurs when foods reach temperatures in excess of 155 °C (311 °F). Charbroiling most food products, especially animal-based proteins such as meat, will release greases and oils that will vaporize and incinerate upon contact with the extremely hot surfaces of a charbroiler. These products of combustion will then imbue the food with a distinct flavor profile that is commonly referred to as being 'charbroiled'.

== Design ==
=== Burners ===
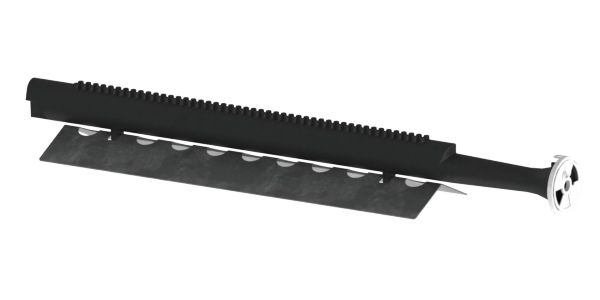
Charbroiler burner – straight cast with under-burner deflector

Charbroiler burners function to provide a largely indirect heat source for the cooking surface, whereby the majority of thermal energy is diffused by the overhead radiant element.

=== Radiants ===
The radiant component of a charbroiler is designed to diffuse, absorb and re-radiate the heat energy generated by the burner. It is almost universally tent-shaped and fabricated from cast iron or sheet metal.

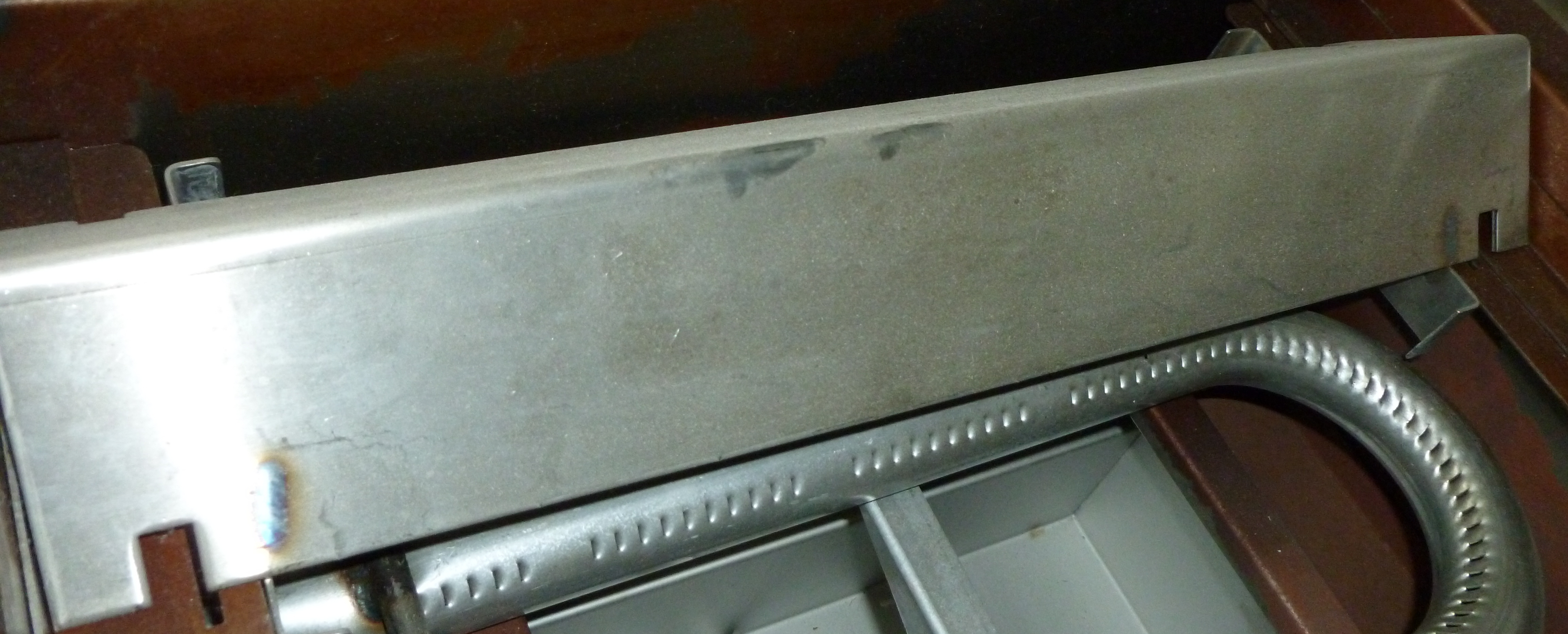
Charbroiler radiant – sheet metal

==== Lava rock, briquettes & charcoal ====
Lava rock, ceramic bricks and even charcoal function as a radiant for the entire burner array. These materials also serve to diffuse the heat generated by the burners, and do so effectively, though inconsistently.

=== Grates ===
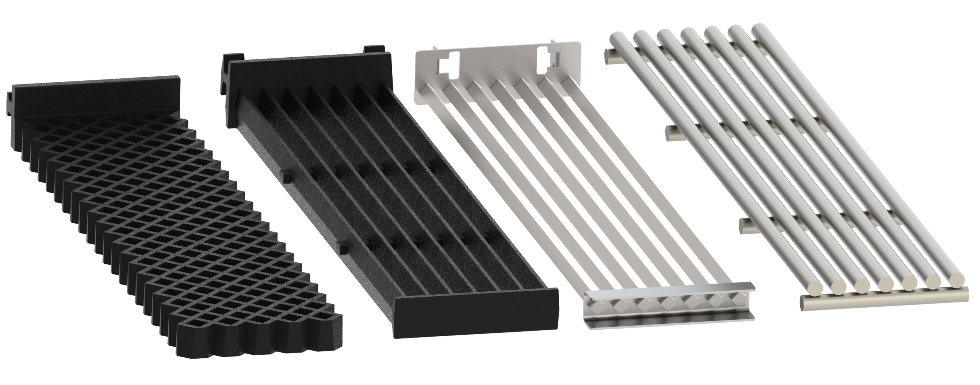
Charbroiler – grates

The grate is the cooking surface of a charbroiler (also known as the cooking grid), and often has a wide range of geometries and materials to meet operational requirements of the user. It is usually an array of ribs oriented front-to-back, commonly with reinforcing members across the middle, either at or below the cooking surface. Cast iron is the most common material used for grates, though steel rods of varying diameters are also readily available.

Grates are responsible for the distinctive sear marks (also known as branding) characteristic of charbroiled foods, and these markings are often key to the image of the restaurant using the charbroiler; markings that are thin, thick and/or cross-branded often distinguish a finished product to the consumer. Proper branding marks on animal proteins should be caramel in color (similar to a cola), but not so dark as to imply burning and charring.

== Use and operation ==
As a general practice charbroilers are operated in the fully ON position, due to the relative inability to control surface temperature with the low range offered by the valves. As illustrated by the temperature profiles of the average charbroiler, operators also tend to manage hot spots by inclining the grates as design allows and so placing the food further away from the elevated heat zone.

Charbroilers are energy intensive, and commonly use 15,000 to 30,000 BTU of gas per burner, per hour. Small units (four burners) will utilize 60,000 to 120,000 BTU/hr (approximately 0.6 – 1.2 therms of natural gas) and larger units up to 13 burners can use 195,000 to 390,000 BTU/hr (approximately 2 – 4 therms of natural gas). The average cost of a therm (100 cubic feet) of natural gas is approximately $1.00 (including taxes and fees, though costs vary by region and over time), which translates into energy costs between $6 and $40 per day for a single unit operating for 10 hours.

== Sources ==
- ”The Culinary Reference Guide”, Fredrick Tiess, 2006, ISBN 0-9724642-1-2
- ”Operating and Safety Instructions, Gas Charbroiler”, The Vollrath Company, Document #2500116-A, Accessed 12/12/2012
- ”Installation & Operation Manual, Gas Charbroilers, Vulcan VCCB and Wolf SCB”, ITW Food Equipment Group, Form F-36952, Published 05-2012, Accessed 12/12/2012
- ”Installation & Operation Manual, Achiever Charbroilers, Vulcan VACB and Wolf ACB”, ITW Food Equipment Group, Form F-36950, Published 07-2010, Accessed 12/12/2012
- ”Installation and Operating Instructions, Dante Series Gas Char Broilers, Models: XX & CH”, Bakers Pride Oven Co., Inc., Document P/N U6023A, Published (9/08), Accessed 12/12/2012
- ”Owner’s Manual, Heavy Duty Counterline, HDC Charbroiler Models”, Southbend (www.southbendnc.com), Manual 1195059, Published (03/11), Accessed 12/12/2012
- ”Range Broiler and Chicken Broiler, Models: JB, JCB, JCBH”, Jade Range, LLC., Document P/N 24-139 Rev A, Published (7/00), Accessed 12/12/2012
- “Vulcan/Wolf Charbroiler – Competitive Analysis”, ITW Food Equipment Group, Form F36970, Published (05/09)
