= Jules Maes Saloon =

Bar in Seattle, Washington, United States

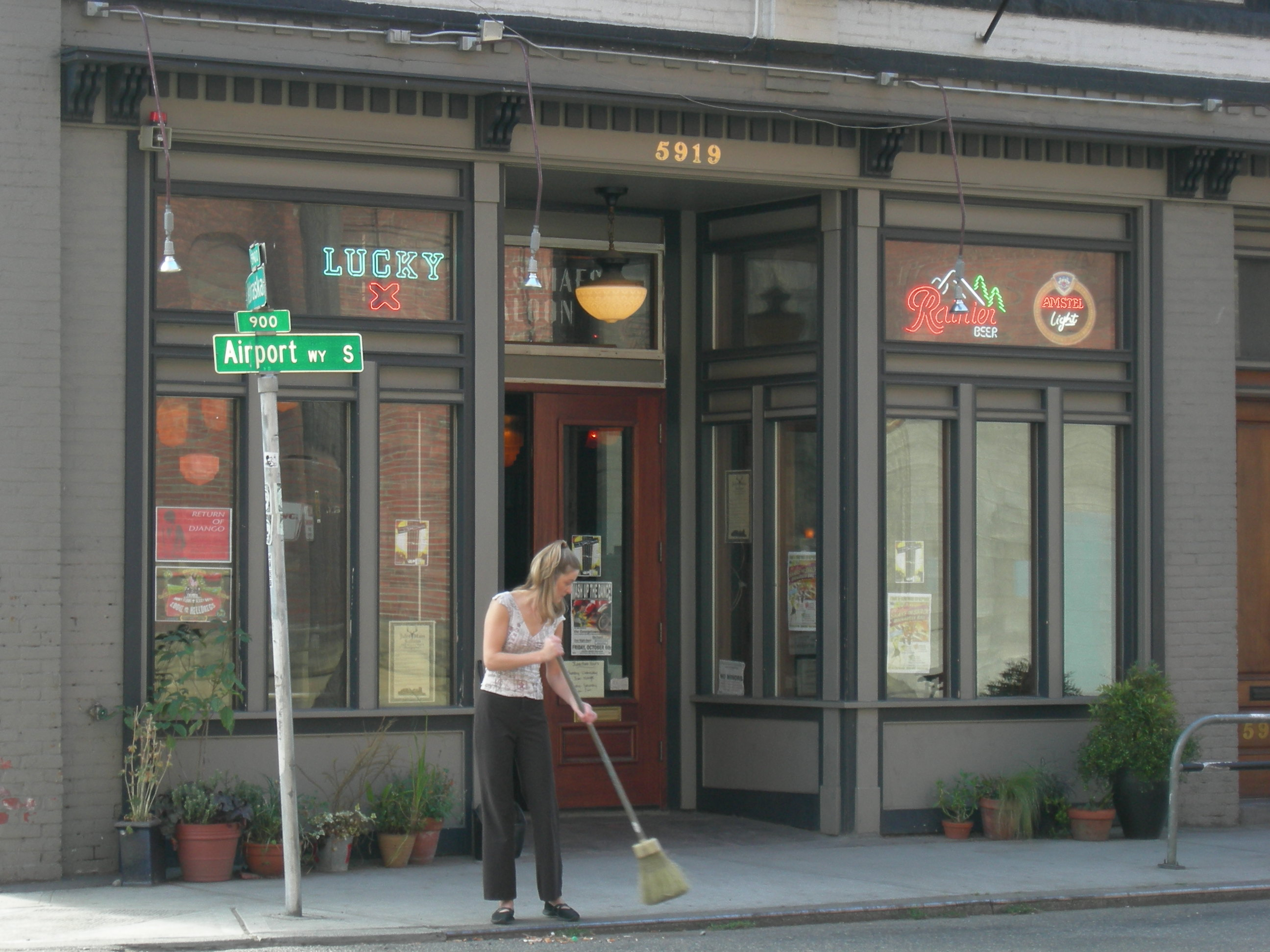
- The restaurant's exterior
- Interactive map of Jules Maes Saloon

Restaurant information
- Location: Seattle, Washington, United States
- Coordinates: 47°32′58.6″N 122°19′3.1″W

Jules Maes Saloon is by some accounts the oldest bar in Seattle, in the U.S. state of Washington. It opened in 1888 in the city's Georgetown neighborhood. The building it occupies, "The Brick Store", at 5919 Airport Way at the corner of Nebraska, is listed as a Seattle Historic Site.

== History ==
The bar first opened in a building at 5953 Airport Way South (before it was called Airport Way, for nearby Boeing Field) under a different name. It was purchased by Jules Gustaf Maes, a Belgian-born bartender, who eventually changed its name and moved it to the 5919 building. The back room was once used as a bookie joint.

The bar was owned by June Espelend for a period. John and Vanessa LeMaster, who had owned it since 2005, closed it during the coronavirus pandemic. It was reopened by Raché Hemmelgarn in January 2021.

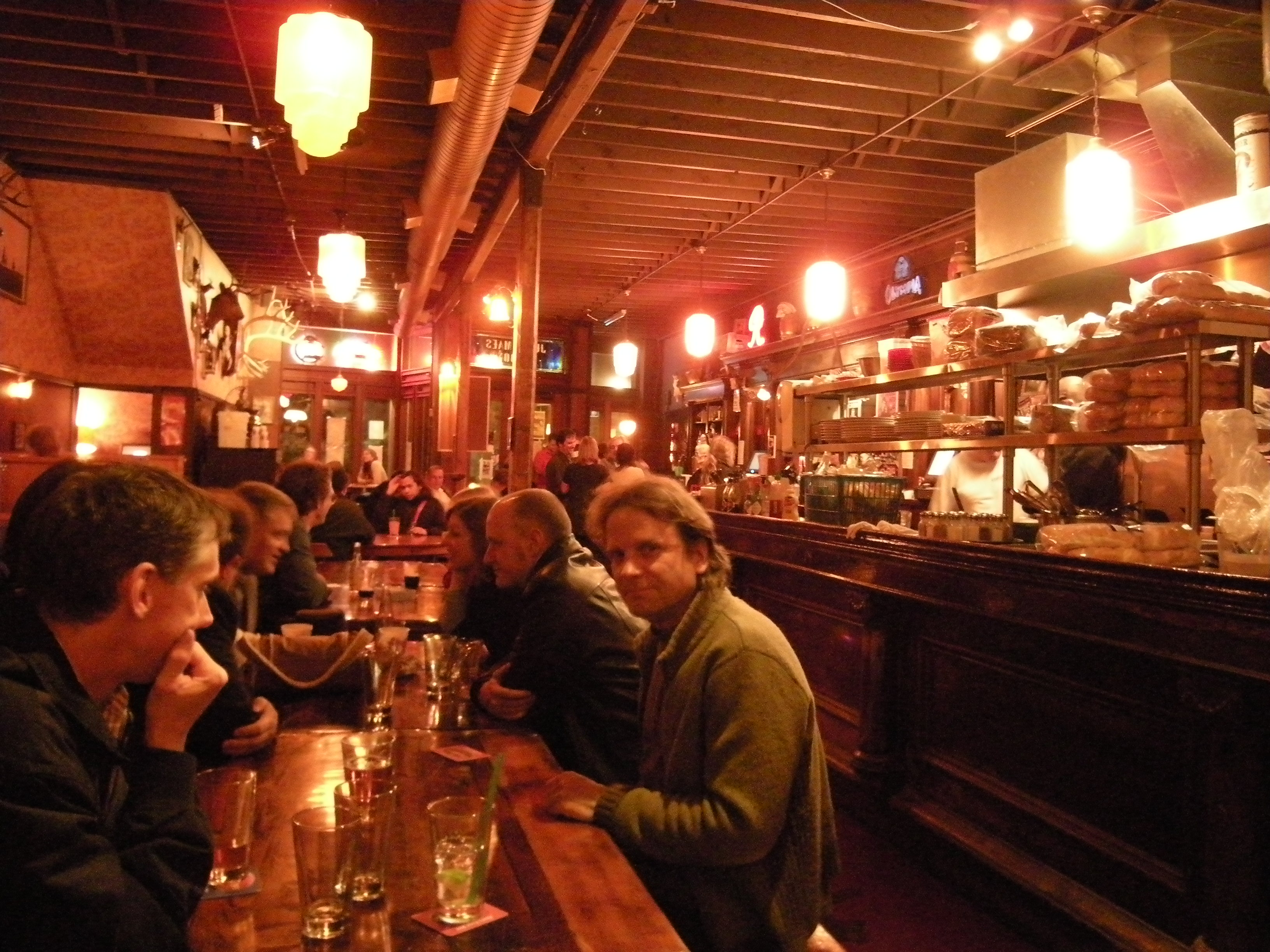
Interior

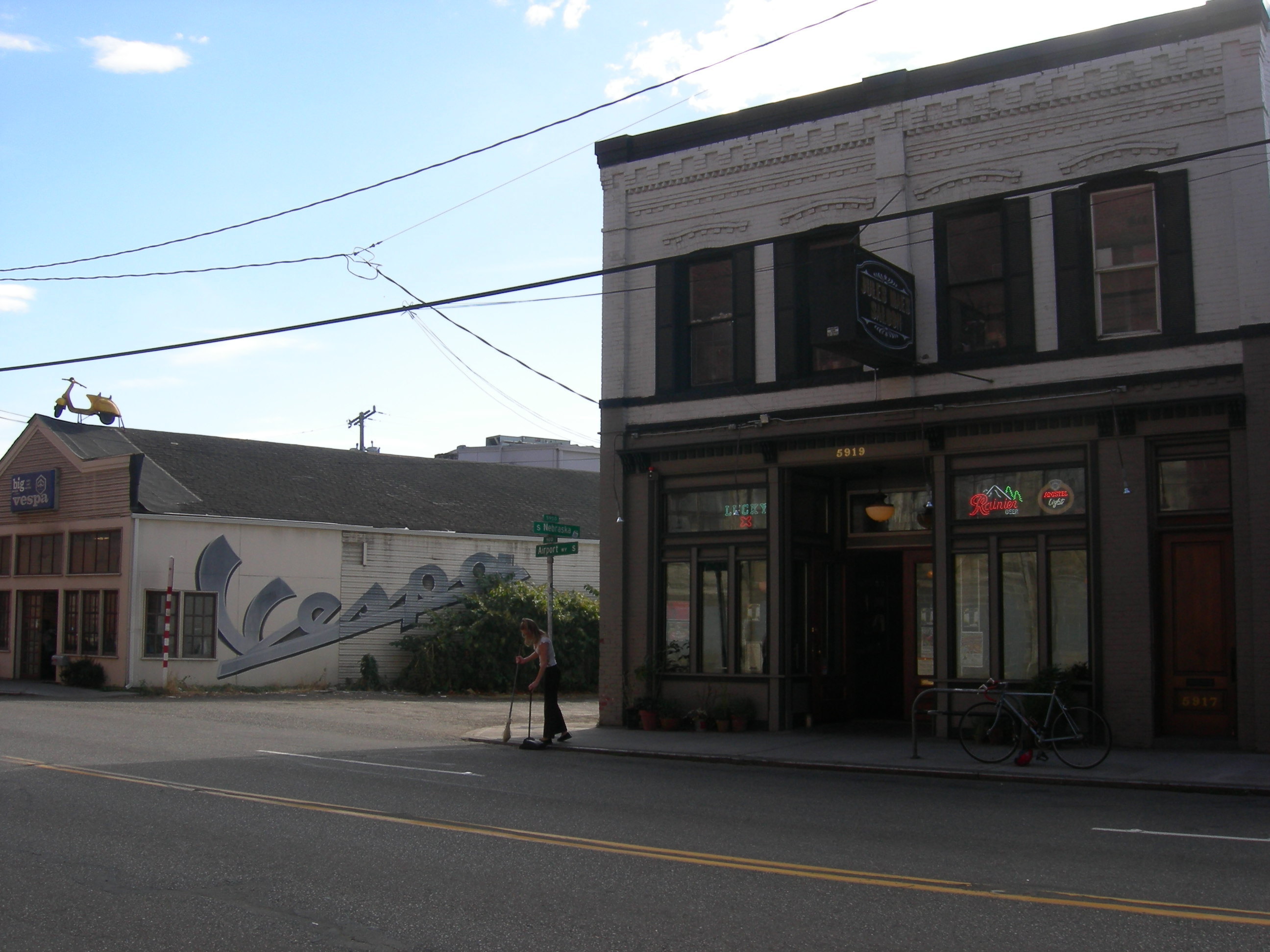
Exterior

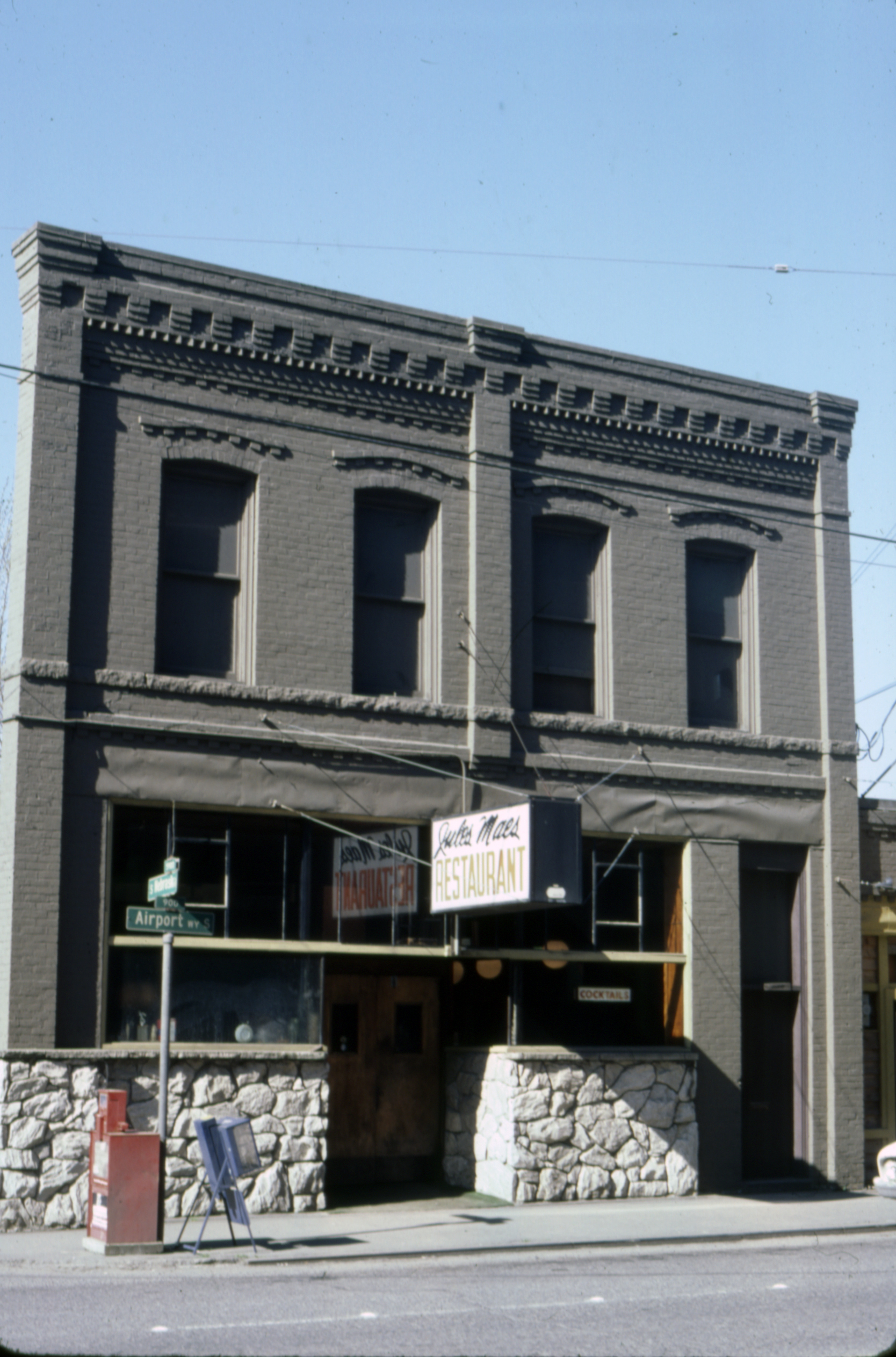
c. 1980
