= List of Michelin 3-star restaurants in the United States =

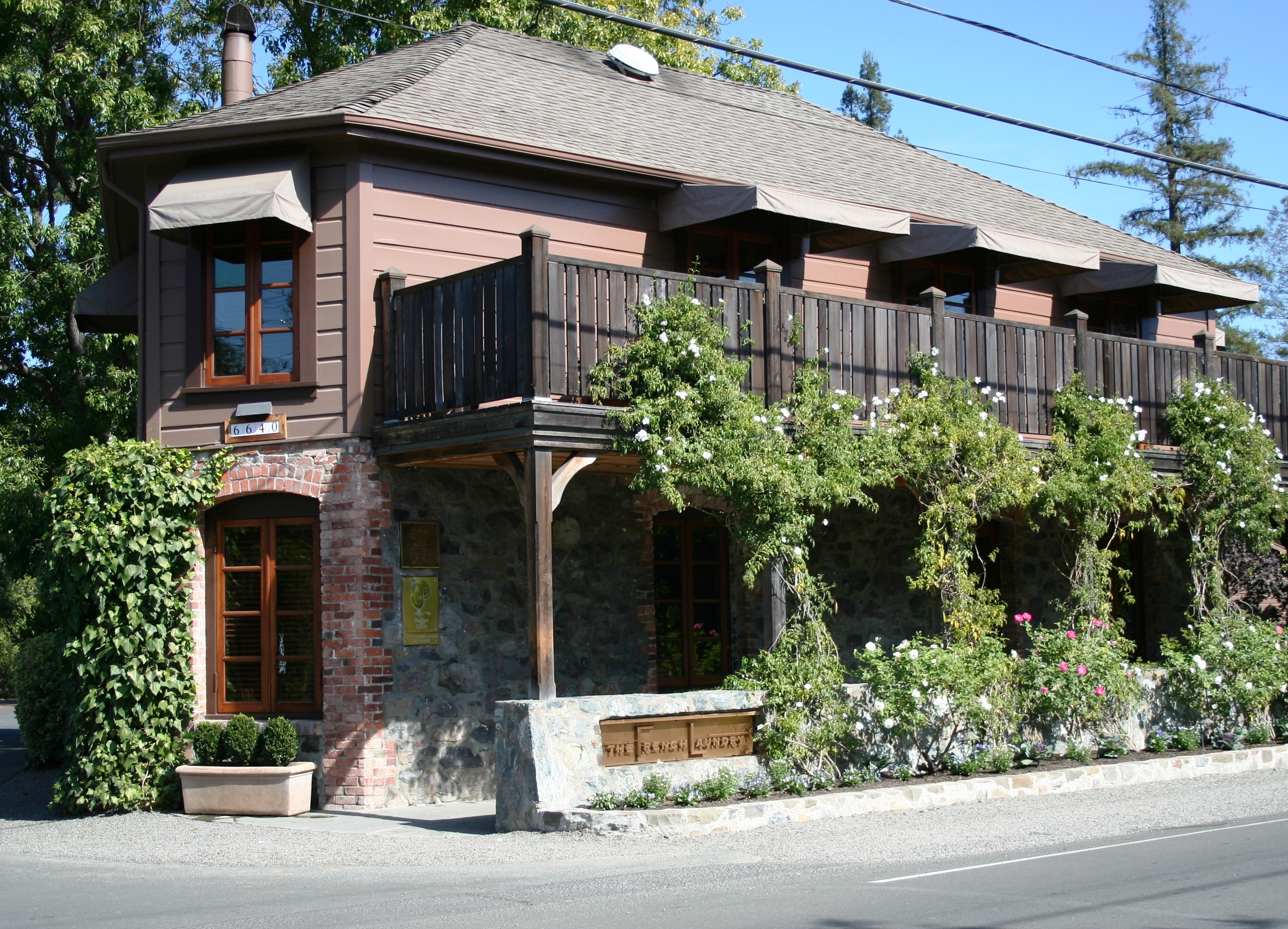
The French Laundry, a 3 Michelin-starred restaurant in Yountville, California

This article contains a complete list of Michelin 3-star restaurants in the United States. Michelin stars are a rating system used by the red Michelin Guide to grade restaurants on their quality. The guide was originally developed in 1900 to show French drivers where local amenities such as restaurants and mechanics were. The rating system was first introduced in 1926 as a single star, with the second and third stars introduced in 1933. According to the Guide, one star signifies "a very good restaurant", two stars are "excellent cooking that is worth a detour", and three stars mean "exceptional cuisine that is worth a special journey". The listing of starred restaurants is updated once per year.

The Michelin Guide began reviewing restaurants in the United States in 2005 beginning with New York City. In subsequent years, Michelin expanded its reviews to other major US cities and regions.

As of the 2026 Michelin Guide, there are 16 restaurants in the US with a rating of 3 Michelin stars.

== List of Michelin 3-star restaurants ==
Key
1 Michelin star	One Michelin star
2 Michelin stars	Two Michelin stars
3 Michelin stars	Three Michelin stars
—	The restaurant did not receive a star that year
Closed	The restaurant is no longer open

Michelin 3-star restaurants
Restaurant	Chef(s)	Cuisine	Location	Current	Year to star			Ref.
Restaurant	Chef(s)	Cuisine	Location	Current	1 Michelin star	2 Michelin stars	3 Michelin stars	Ref.
Addison	William Bradley	California	San Diego	3 Michelin stars	2019	2021	2022–present	
Alain Ducasse at the Essex House	Alain Ducasse	French	New York City	Closed	—	—	2006	
Alinea	Grant Achatz and Doug Alley	Molecular gastronomy	Chicago	2 Michelin stars	—	2025	2011–2024	
Atelier Crenn	Dominique Crenn	French	San Francisco	3 Michelin stars	2012	2013–2018	2019–present	
Benu	Corey Lee and Brandon Rodgers	Asian-inspired New American	San Francisco	3 Michelin stars	—	2012–2014	2015–present	
Californios	Val M. Cantu	Mexican	San Francisco	3 Michelin stars	2015–2017	2017–2025	2026	
Chef's Table at Brooklyn Fare	César Ramírez (Note: Ramirez fired as head chef in July 2023); Max Natmessnig and Marco Prins	Seafood, omakase-style	New York City	2 Michelin stars	—	2011, 2024–present	2012–2022	
Coi	Daniel Patterson	Seafood	San Francisco	Closed	2008	2009–2016; 2019–2021	2017–2018	
Daniel	Daniel Boulud	French	New York City	1 Michelin star	2024–present	2006–2010; 2016–2023	2011–2015	
Eleven Madison Park	Daniel Humm and Brian Lockwood	Contemporary American	New York City	3 Michelin stars	2010–2011	—	2012–present	
Enclos	Brian Limoges	Contemporary	Sonoma, California	3 Michelin stars	—	2025	2026	
Grace	Curtis Duffy	Progressive	Chicago	Closed	—	2014	2015–2018	(Note: Closed in December 2017)
Jean-Georges	Mark LaPico	French	New York City	2 Michelin stars	—	2018–present	2006–2017	
Joël Robuchon	Christophe De Lellis (Note: Christophe de Lellis departed as executive chef in 2024), Eleazar Villanueva	French	Las Vegas	2 Michelin stars	—	2026	2008–2009	(Note: Due to poor sales of the Michelin Guide for Las Vegas, Michelin stopped reviewing the Las Vegas market in 2009)
Jungsik	Jungsik Yim	Korean	New York	3 Michelin stars	2011–2012	2013–2023	2024–present	
L_{2}O	Laurent Gras	Seafood	Chicago	Closed	2011	2012–2014	2010	(Note: Closed in December 2014)
Le Bernardin	Éric Ripert, Chris Muller, and Eric Gestel	French	New York City	3 Michelin stars	—	—	2006–present	
Manresa	David Kinch and Nicholas Romero	California	Los Gatos, California	Closed	—	2006–2015	2016–2022	
Masa	Masa Takayama	Japanese and sushi	New York City	2 Michelin stars	—	2006–2008; 2025	2009–2024	
Per Se	Thomas Keller and Corey Chow	New American	New York City	3 Michelin stars	—	—	2006–present	
Providence	Michael Cimarusti	Seafood	Los Angeles	3 Michelin stars	2008	2009; 2019; 2021–2024	2025–present	
Quince	Michael Tusk and Neil Stetz	Contemporary Californian and Italian	San Francisco	3 Michelin stars	2006–2013	2014–2016	2017–present	
Saison	Richard Lee	New American	San Francisco	2 Michelin stars	2011	2012–2014; 2019–present	2015–2018	
SingleThread	Kyle Connaughton	Japanese and New American	Healdsburg, California	3 Michelin stars	—	2018	2019–present	
Smyth	John B. Shields and Karen Urie Shields	Contemporary	Chicago	3 Michelin stars	2017	2018–2022	2023–present	
Somni	Aitor Zabala	Contemporary	West Hollywood, California	3 Michelin stars	—	2019	2025–present	
Sushi Sho	Keiji Nakazawa	Japanese	New York City	3 Michelin stars	—	2024	2025	
The French Laundry	Thomas Keller and David Breeden	French with California influences	Yountville, California	3 Michelin stars	—	—	2007–present	
The Inn at Little Washington	Patrick O'Connell	Nouveau American	Washington, Virginia	2 Michelin stars	—	2017–2018, 2025	2019–2024	
The Restaurant at Meadowood	Christopher Kostow	California	St. Helena, California	Closed	—	2008–2010	2011–2019	(Note: Closed in Sept 2020 after being destroyed in the Glass Fire)

== See also ==
- List of Michelin 3-star restaurants
- List of Michelin 3-star restaurants in the United Kingdom
