= Enclos (restaurant) =

Restaurant in Sonoma, California, U.S.

- Interactive map of Enclos

Restaurant information
- Chef: Brian Limoges
- Rating: (Michelin Guide)
- Location: Sonoma, California, United States
- Coordinates: 38°17′29″N 122°27′21″W
- Website: enclos-sonoma.com

Enclos is a Michelin-starred fine dining restaurant in Sonoma, California, United States. It opened in December 2024 and is located in a restored Victorian house near Sonoma Plaza. Executive chef Brian Limoges leads the kitchen, which earned two Michelin stars and a Michelin Green Star for sustainability in the 2025 California Michelin Guide within its first year of operation.

== Description ==
The fine dining restaurant Enclos operates in a renovated 1880s Victorian house in downtown Sonoma.

== History ==
Enclos was developed by Stone Edge Farm Estate Vineyards & Winery, whose proprietors expanded their wine and farm operations with a fine dining restaurant in downtown Sonoma. The restaurant opened in December 2024 with Brian Limoges, a chef with prior experience at Michelin-starred establishments including Atelier Crenn, Quince, Birdsong, Saison and Angler—where he previously served as corporate chef at Saison and Angler.

Within six months of its opening, Enclos was awarded two Michelin stars and a Michelin Green Star, marking the first Michelin recognition for a restaurant in the City of Sonoma. The Michelin Green Star highlights the restaurant’s sustainable practices, including its integration with Stone Edge Farm’s carbon-negative microgrid and regenerative agriculture.

== Menu ==
Enclos serves an eight- to ten-course tasting menu that emphasizes seasonality, terroir, and local produce. Many ingredients are sourced from Stone Edge Farm’s organic gardens, orchards, and vineyards, along with regional meats, dairy and seafood. The cuisine blends French technique with California coastal influences and nods to Limoges’ New England background.

The tasting menu changes regularly to reflect peak seasonal ingredients and often includes creative reinterpretations of familiar flavors. An adjacent lounge space offers à la carte dishes and curated wine pairings for members of Stone Edge Farm’s Collectors Cellar.

== Reception ==
Enclos received critical attention shortly after opening in late 2024, particularly following its inclusion in the 2025 Michelin Guide. The restaurant was awarded two Michelin stars and a Michelin Green Star for sustainability within its first year of eligibility, a rare achievement that marked the first Michelin recognition for a restaurant in the City of Sonoma. This rapid elevation was noted by critics as an exceptional debut in the Michelin system and added to Sonoma’s relevance as a culinary destination.

Food writers highlighted the restaurant’s tasting menu for its seasonal focus and refined technique, with early predictions from critics suggesting it would become a Michelin contender prior to the guide’s release. Local media and tourism organizations described the achievement as a milestone for Sonoma County’s dining scene, emphasizing the role of sustainable practices and locally sourced ingredients in the restaurant’s acclaim.

Industry and local coverage have also described Enclos as contributing to Sonoma’s emergence as a destination for fine dining outside of the traditional Napa and Healdsburg regions.

In a feature for Galerie, Ryan Waddoups highlighted the collaboration between designer Jiun Ho and chef Brian Limoges, noting the restaurant’s multisensory approach and its use of natural materials, artwork, and spatial sequencing to integrate design with the dining experience.

== Architecture and design ==
Enclos is housed in a renovated 1880s Victorian residence near Sonoma Plaza. The interior design incorporates reclaimed materials and influences from Japanese and Nordic aesthetics, with charred wood paneling, reclaimed wine barrel floors and custom furnishings. The dining room is designed for an experience with views of the open kitchen and use of natural materials that complement the restaurant’s culinary ethos.

The interior of Enclos was designed by Jiun Ho and is conceived as an integrated, narrative-driven environment in which architectural elements, artwork, and materials are intended to unfold progressively alongside the dining experience. The restaurant occupies a renovated Victorian-era building in Sonoma and incorporates design references associated with Japanese wabi-sabi principles, Nordic minimalism, and regional Northern California architecture.

The interior is characterized by the use of natural and tactile materials, including charred shou sugi ban wood surfaces, custom live-edge teak tables, felted wool panels crafted by Jessica Switzer Green, and hand-finished architectural details.

=== Stone Edge Farm Estate Vineyards & Winery ===
Stone Edge Farm Estate Vineyards & Winery, located nearby in Sonoma County, supplies much of the Enclos’s produce and contributes to its farm-to-table approach. The farm operates a carbon-negative microgrid and follows regenerative agricultural practices, producing fruits, vegetables, honey, olive oil, and wine. The farm is led by Colby Eierman, while the vineyard and wine production are overseen by the estate’s winemaking team.

The winery was founded in 2004 by Mac McQuown and his wife Leslie McQuown, together with founding winemaker Jeff Baker and viticulturist Phil Coturri, with a vision to craft elegant, age-worthy wines that reflect the region’s distinctive soils and climate.

It operates estate vineyards both near Sonoma Square and on the slopes of the Moon Mountain District in the Mayacamas range, where rocky, volcanic soils and elevated terrain contribute to structured red and white varietals. Enclos limited-production wines often including Cabernet Sauvignon, Sauvignon Blanc, and Bordeaux blends are available primarily direct from the winery and through a collectors’ membership program.

== See also ==
- List of Michelin 3-star restaurants in the United States
- List of Michelin-starred restaurants in California
