= Chez TJ =

French restaurant in Mountain View, California, U.S.

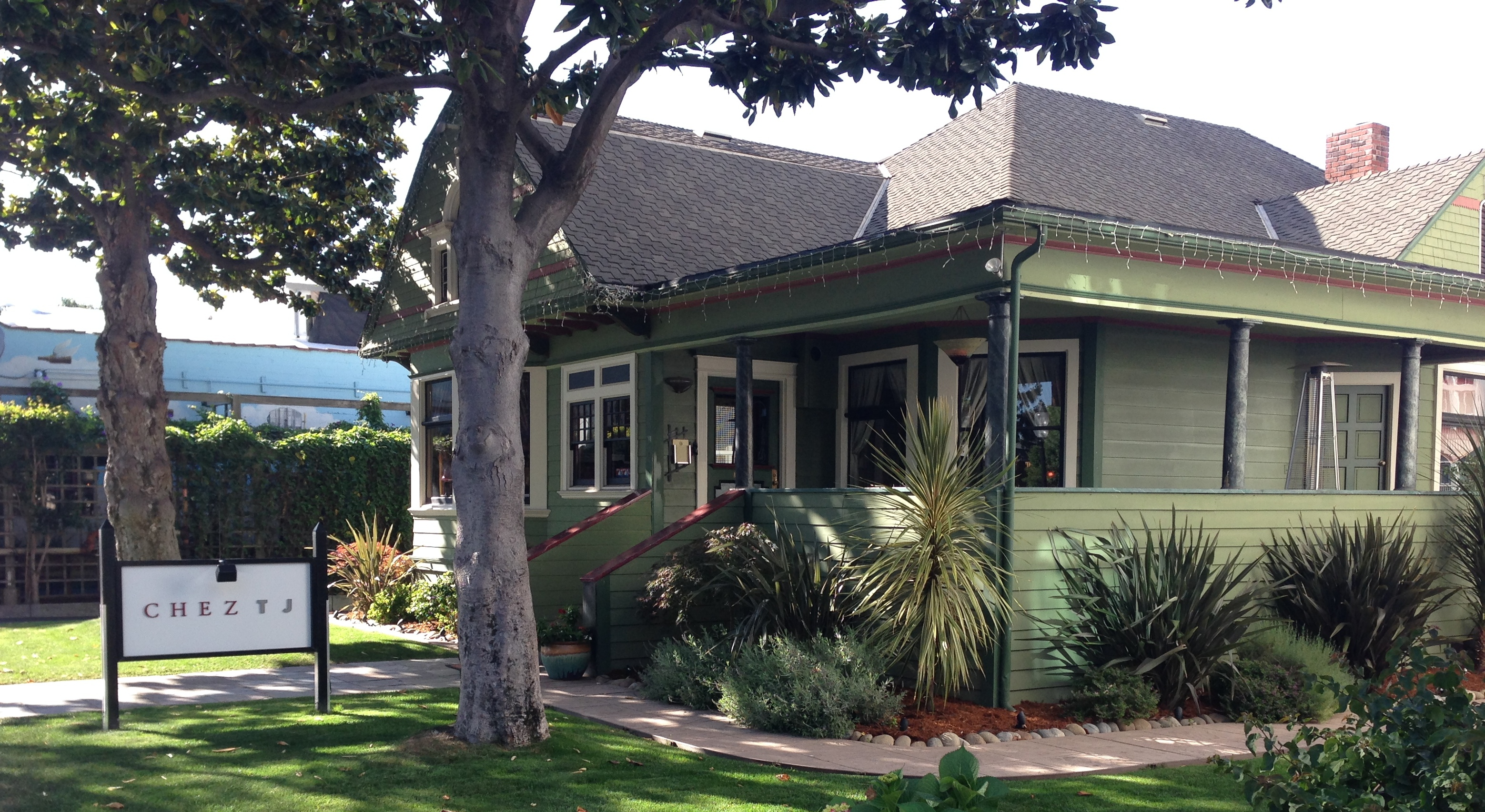
- Chez TJ in 2014
- Interactive map of Chez TJ

Restaurant information
- Established: November 1982
- Closed: April 11, 2026
- Owner: George Aviet
- Previous owners: Tom McCombie and George Aviet
- Head chef: Mo Bejar
- Food type: modern French
- Location: 938 Villa Street, Mountain View, California, United States
- Coordinates: 37°23′41″N 122°04′49″W
- Seating capacity: 40 plus patio
- Website: www.cheztj.com

Chez TJ was a French restaurant in Mountain View, California, United States. Opened in 1982 and closed in 2026, it was located in a historic house and until 2025 had a Michelin star; from 2007 to 2009, it had two stars.

== History ==
Tom McCombie and George Aviet opened Chez TJ in November 1982 in a Victorian house in downtown Mountain View that had been a bed and breakfast, naming it for McCombie's initials. It was the first fine dining restaurant in the city. The founders met while working at Pear Williams restaurant in Menlo Park, sold McCombie's house for the capital to start the restaurant, and lived with their families in the building until it became successful enough to fill the entire space.

McCombie, the original chef, died in 1994 and Aviet became sole owner, living in a cottage behind the restaurant. Subsequent executive chefs included Peggy Aoki, in the second half of the 1990s Andrew Trice, and from 1999 Kirk Bruderer. Joshua Skenes, later executive chef at Saison, succeeded Bruderer, followed in early 2006 by Christopher Kostow, under whom Chez TJ earned its first Michelin star that year and a second star in 2007. Kostow left in early 2008 for The Restaurant at Meadowood, accompanied by many of the cooks. Under his successor Bruno Chemel, the restaurant lost its second Michelin star in 2009, leading to a falling out with Aviet; Chemel also left with a large part of the kitchen staff, opening Baumé. He was succeeded in early 2010 by Scott Nishiyama, followed in 2012 by Joey Elenterio and then by Jarad Gallagher, who had been chef at Plumed Horse.

After the COVID-19 closure, Chez TJ reopened in September 2020 after extensive renovations that included improved ventilation in the dining rooms and an added outdoor seating area with an automatic retractable rain awning, and with the option of à la carte dining. Gallagher left and was succeeded by Christopher Lemerand prior to the reopening. In 2022, the restaurant acquired a full liquor license and added a bar. Stan Michalski became the executive chef in 2024. As of March 2026, Mo Bejar was executive chef.

Aviet closed Chez TJ on April 11, 2026, citing financial and health problems.

== Restaurant ==
Chez TJ offered prix fixe dinners with optional wine pairings, in its first two decades ranging from a four-course menu petite through a five-course menu moderne to a seven-course menu gastronomique; by 2008 an eight-course tasting menu was the alternative to a four-course menu gastronomique. The cuisine was modern French.

The restaurant occupied a house in downtown Mountain View that was the home of Julius Weilheimer, an early 20th-century mayor and postmaster. It seated approximately 40, in four dining rooms. There was a herb and vegetable garden on the property.

In 2017, Aviet and the owner of the adjacent Tied House brewpub unsuccessfully applied to the City of Mountain View for permission to redevelop both sites with a four-storey office tower that would house Chez TJ within it. Aviet offered to relocate the house. In response to an effort by preservationists to prevent redevelopment, the two buildings were added to the California Register of Historic Resources in 2019. Aviet later said that the designation had prevented him from selling the property to a developer for sufficient money to fund his retirement.

== Reception ==
Under chef Christopher Kostow, Chez TJ was awarded a Michelin star in 2006, the first year the Michelin Guide expanded the awards to California, and a second star in 2007. In December 2007, Food & Wine named the maitake mushroom consommé one of the top ten in its Best Restaurant Dishes of 2007. The second Michelin star was withdrawn in 2009; the restaurant retained the single star until 2025.

The Michelin Guide characterized the restaurant as "offer[ing] a certain old-school sophistication" and having a wine list that is "nothing short of legendary." Local restaurant reviewers emphasized its excellence. The long-time food critic of the San Francisco Chronicle, Michael Bauer, faulted the decor and maintenance of the house and the wine selections in both 2007 and 2010 reviews, but praised both Kostow's and Nishiyama's cooking highly. In 2008 he raised his rating to three stars after the arrival of Chemel, and in 2014 he wrote that "few restaurants have contributed as much to the entire Bay Area dining scene as Chez TJ." In San Jose media, the reviewer for Metro Silicon Valley judged Chez TJ to have gone from "sleepy" to "a sensation" under Kostow, and Chemel to have "a good shot" at retaining the second star, but that his first and second courses outshone the third; reviewers for The Mercury News characterized Chemel as replacing Kostow's "drama and virtuosity" with "quiet elegance and sophistication" and later praised Nishiyama for "an incredible command of flavor and composition".

== See also ==
- List of French restaurants
- List of Michelin-starred restaurants in California
