= Brian Limoges =

American chef

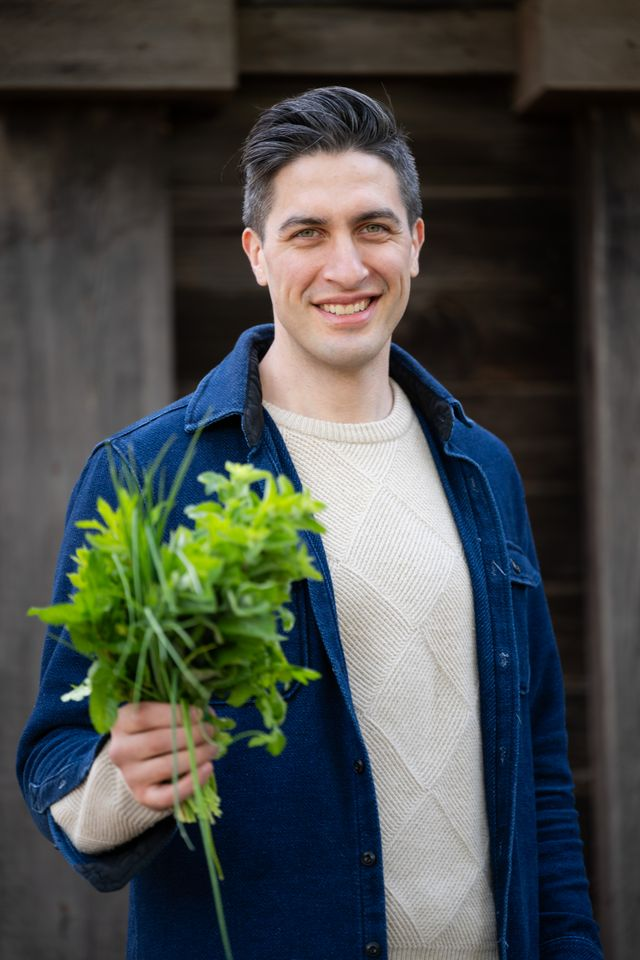
- Born: Claremont, New Hampshire, United States
- Education: New England Culinary Institute
- Culinary career
- Current restaurant: Enclos

Brian Limoges is an American chef and executive chef of Enclos, a restaurant in Sonoma, California, where he earned three Michelin stars and a Michelin Green Star. His recipes and works have been featured in Eater SF, the Michelin Guide, Forbes and the Press Democrat.

== Biography ==
Limoges was born and raised in Claremont, New Hampshire, where he developed an interest for local ingredients and the flavors of coastal New England. He is a graduate of the New England Culinary Institute in Montpelier, Vermont.

== Career ==
Limoges began his culinary career after graduation, developing foundational skills in classical cooking. He subsequently worked in Massachusetts at restaurants including Oleana in Cambridge and Coppa in Boston.

In 2013, Limoges moved to San Francisco, when he joined the kitchen of Atelier Crenn as a sous chef. He then joined Quince, a fine dining restaurant in San Francisco, as executive sous chef during the restaurant's post-renovation period.

In 2018, Limoges became chef de cuisine at Birdsong, another San Francisco restaurant. During his tenure, Birdsong earned a Michelin star within its first year of operation.

Limoges moved to the United Kingdom to help launch Henrock Restaurant in northern England alongside chef Simon Rogan, serving as head chef.

Upon returning to California, Limoges started working as corporate chef for the Saison Restaurant Group. In 2024, Limoges became executive chef of Enclos , a fine dining restaurant in downtown Sonoma, California. He earned two Michelin stars and a Michelin Green Star within about six months of opening.
