= SingleThread =

Restaurant in California, United States

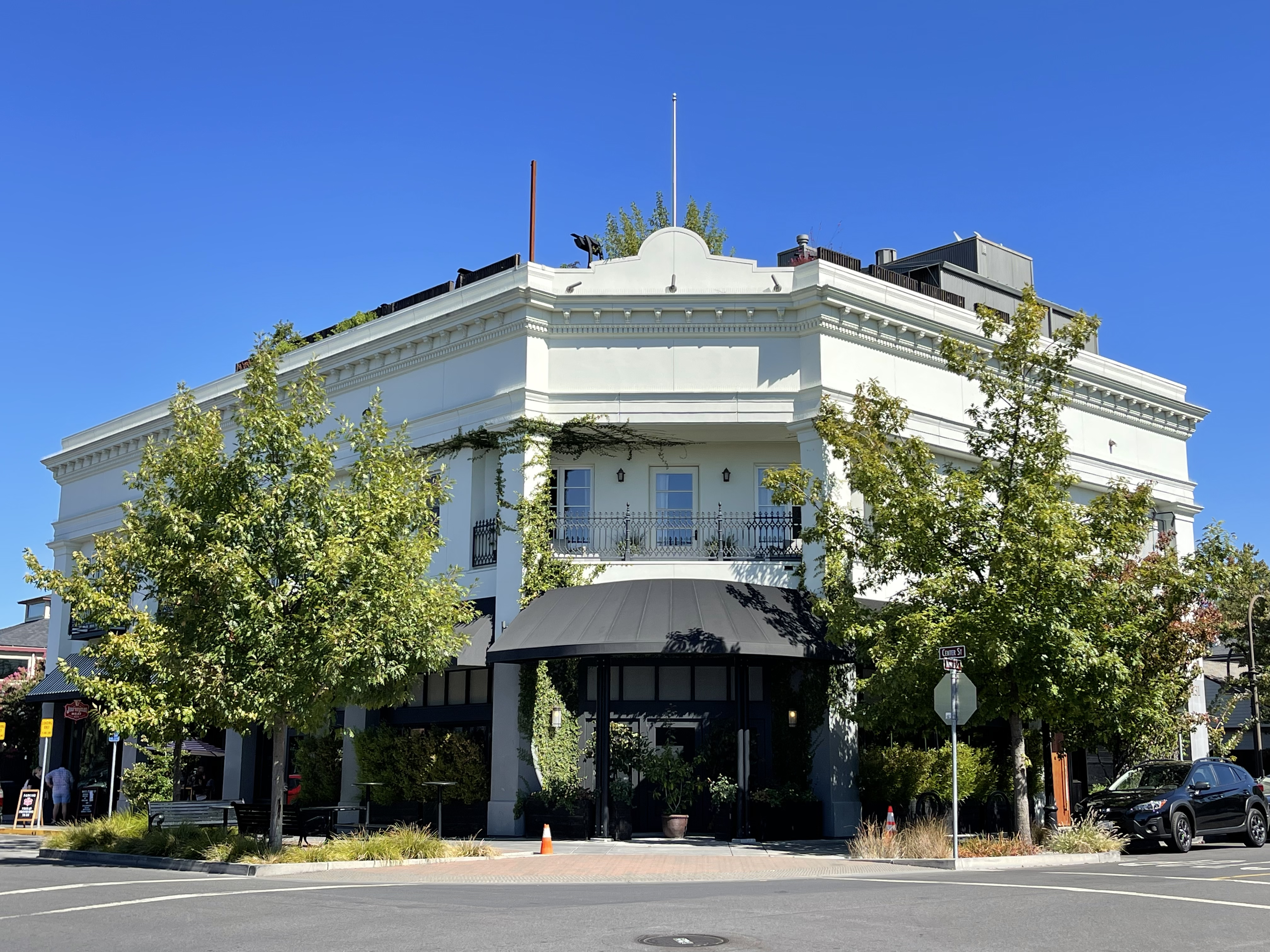
- SingleThread in September 2022.
- Interactive map of SingleThread

Restaurant information
- Established: 2016; 10 years ago
- Owners: Kyle & Katina Connaughton, Tony Greenberg
- Head chef: Kyle Connaughton
- Food type: Japanese and New American
- Rating: (Michelin Guide); (Michelin Guide); AAA Five Diamond Award (2019-2025)
- Location: 131 North St., Healdsburg, California, 95448, United States
- Coordinates: 38.6123333°N 122.8696579°W
- Seating capacity: 55
- Website: Official website

SingleThread is a farm, restaurant, and inn, located in Healdsburg, California.

== Farm, restaurant, and inn ==
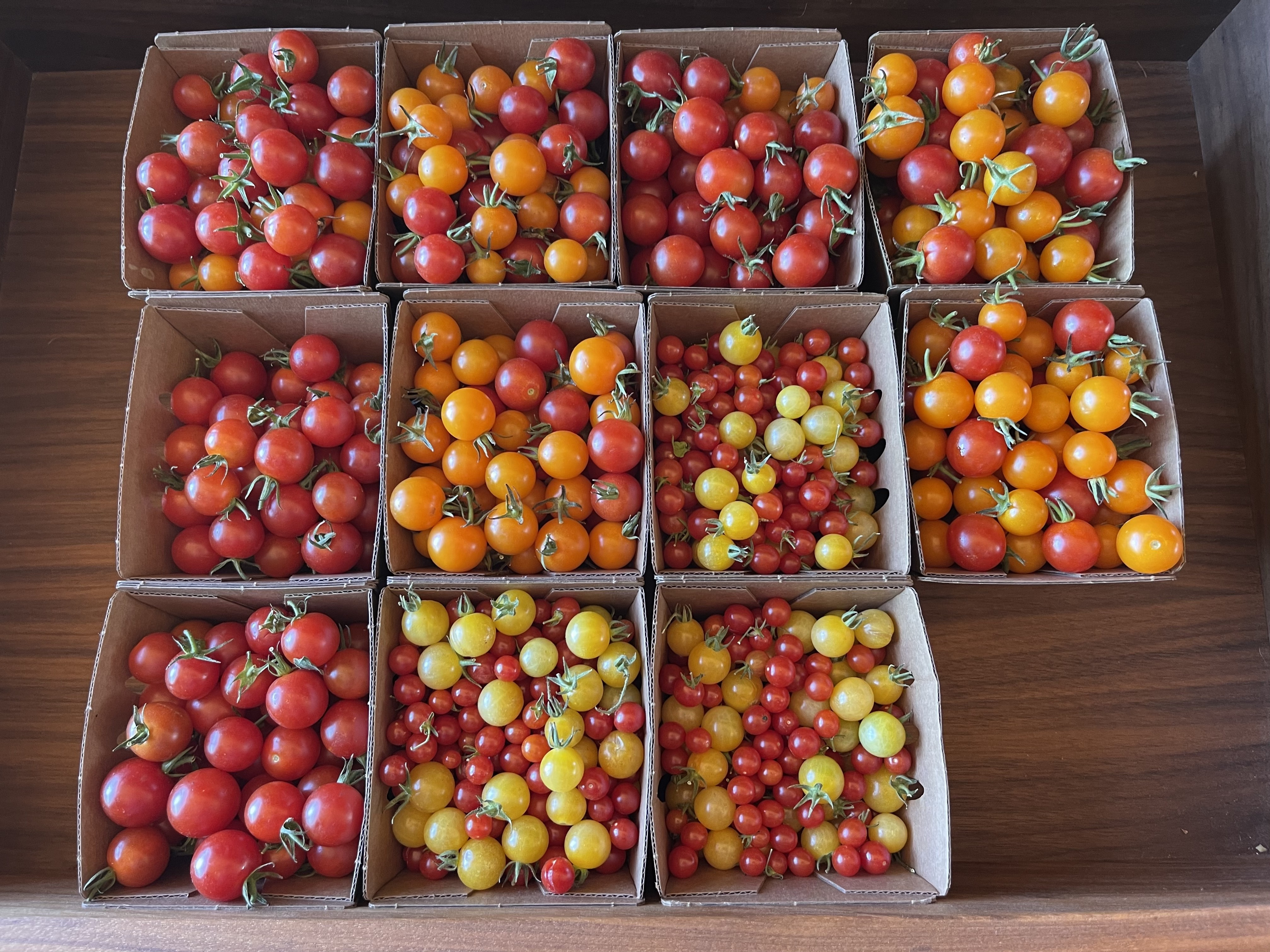
Tomatoes for sale at SingleThread's farm stand in Healdsburg. The farm stand opened in 2022.

In 2014, Kyle and Katina Connaughton bought property in Sonoma County, California for a five-acre farm, restaurant, and inn located in downtown Healdsburg. They worked over two years to cultivate the farm's vegetables and flowers, olive trees, fruit orchards, beehives, chickens, and cattle. They prepared the inn and developed a menu for the restaurant, opening in December 2016 as SingleThread.

The menu at SingleThread combines Japanese influences with farm-to-table ingredients. The dinner menu features 11 courses, with vegetarian, pescatarian, and omnivore options and dishes changing each night.

== Ownership ==
The owners, Kyle and Katina Connaughton, were high school classmates in the suburbs of Los Angeles who married and had two daughters, Chloe and Ava. Kyle and Katina had lifelong dreams of opening their own farm and restaurant in Northern California.

Kyle Connaughton attended culinary school and worked in several notable restaurants in Los Angeles, including Spago, Campanile, and Suzanne Goin’s AOC and Lucques. Connaughton then trained as a sushi chef, working under Andy Matsuda at the Sushi Chef Institute. In 2003, Connaughton moved to Japan to work for Michel Bras in Hokkaido. In 2006, Connaughton moved to England to work for Heston Blumenthal at The Fat Duck. During their travels, Katina Connaughton studied sustainable agriculture and English and Japanese gardens.

In 2015, Kyle Connaughton published a cookbook, Donabe: Classic and Modern Japanese Clay Pot Cooking with Naoko Takei Moore.

== Awards and accolades ==
The San Francisco Chronicle gave the restaurant four stars. The World's 50 Best Restaurants named SingleThread its "One To Watch" in 2018. The Michelin Guide awarded SingleThread two stars in the 2018 Michelin Guide for San Francisco, and three stars in 2019. As of 2025, there are 16 three-star restaurants in the United States, with eight of them being in California.

Eater named SingleThread one of the most beautiful restaurants of 2016, and the restaurant's design (by AvroKO) won a James Beard Award in 2017.

== See also ==
- List of Michelin 3-star restaurants
- List of Michelin 3-star restaurants in the United States
- List of Michelin-starred restaurants in California
