= Bar Crenn =

Bar and restaurant in San Francisco, California, U.S.

- Interactive map of Bar Crenn

Restaurant information
- Dress code: Casual-elegant, jacket not required
- Rating: (Michelin Guide)
- Location: 3131 Fillmore Street, San Francisco, California, 94123, United States
- Coordinates: 37°47′54.3″N 122°26′9.4″W
- Website: www.barcrenn.com/le-comptoir/

Bar Crenn, specifically Le Comptoir at Bar Crenn, is a Michelin-starred bar and restaurant in San Francisco, California.

Bar Crenn has two sections, Le Comptoir and the Lounge. Le Comptoir is a seafood-based tasting menu served live at a counter while the lounge serves cocktails and an à la carte menu focusing on Japanese and French cuisines.

In June 2026, Dominique Crenn announced Le Comptoir, the Michelin-starred dinner counter, will close in 2026 to expand the menu at the cocktail lounge. Crenn wrote on Instagram, closing the dinner experience at Bar Crenn "allows us to create more of the warm, welcoming atmosphere our guests have come to love, a place where they can settle in, connect, and truly feel at home,"

== See also ==
- Atelier Crenn
- List of Michelin-starred restaurants in California
