= Saison (disambiguation) =

Saison is a type of beer.

Saison may also refer to:

- Saison (restaurant), a Michelin-starred restaurant in San Francisco, California
- Ella May Saison
- Credit Saison
- Saison River
- The Hunting Season
