= César (restaurant) =

Restaurant in Manhattan, New York, U.S.

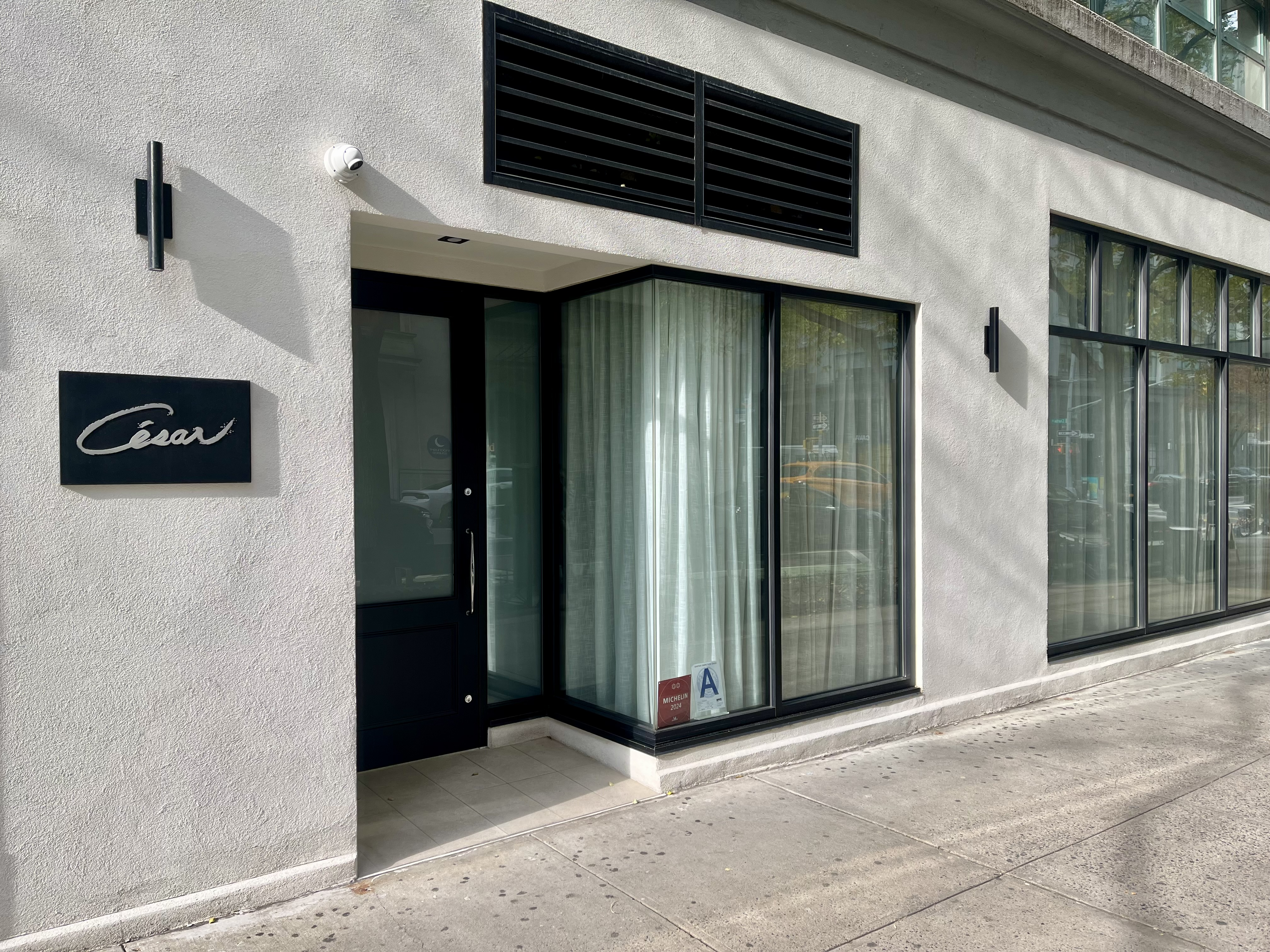
- The restaurant's exterior in 2025
- Interactive map of César

Restaurant information
- Established: July 15, 2024
- Owner: César Ramírez
- Head chef: César Ramírez
- Food type: Contemporary, Seafood
- Rating: (Michelin Guide)
- Location: 333 Hudson Street, New York City, New York, 10013, United States
- Coordinates: 40°43′38″N 74°00′27″W
- Website: www.cesar.restaurant

César is a Michelin-starred restaurant in the Hudson Square neighborhood of Manhattan, New York, serving primarily seafood.

== History ==
The restaurant was opened by César Ramírez, the previous head chef at Chef's Table at Brooklyn Fare and opened on July 15, 2024.

== Reception ==
In the 2025 list of The World's 50 Best Restaurants, César was ranked number 98 in the extended list.

== See also ==
- List of Michelin-starred restaurants in New York City
