= Kyle Connaughton =

American chef

- Education: Institute of Culinary Education
- Culinary career
- Current restaurant: SingleThread

Kyle Connaughton is an American chef and restaurateur best known for his Michelin-starred restaurant SingleThread in Healdsburg, California.

== Early years ==
Connaughton was raised in Southern California and attended culinary school in Pasadena at the Institute of Culinary Education. He worked in numerous top Los Angeles restaurants including Spago in Beverly Hills and The Dining Room at the Ritz Carlton. He then spent several years in Japan working for French chef Michel Bras before joining Heston Blumenthal at The Fat Duck in Bray, England, as Head Chef of Research and Development.

== SingleThread ==
In 2016, Connaughton opened SingleThread, a 55-seat tasting-menu restaurant and inn. His wife and co-owner Katina, runs a nearby farm that provides 70% of all ingredients used in the restaurant.

== Personal life ==
Connaughton met his wife Katina while they attended high school in the suburbs of Los Angeles. They have two daughters, Chloe and Ava.

== Awards ==
- 2023 included in Robb Report's list of 50 Most Influential People in American Fine Dining
- Honorary Doctorate by the Culinary Institute of America

== Bibliography ==
- Donabe: Classic and Modern Japanese :Clay Pot Cooking; Ten Speed Press; ISBN 978-1607746997; 2015
- SingleThread: A Seasonal Approach to Intentional Cooking, Farming, and Hospitality ;DK; ISBN 978-0593970010; 2026
