= Christopher Kostow =

American chef (born 1976)

- Born: Christopher Kostow; 1976 (age 49–50); Highland Park, Illinois
- Education: Apprenticeship
- Spouse: Martina Kostow
- Culinary career
- Cooking style: California, French, and New American
- Current restaurant: The Restaurant at Meadowood

Christopher Kostow (born 1976) is the executive chef at The Restaurant at Meadowood in Napa Valley, California. Under chef-owner Kostow, The restaurant was awarded three stars by the Michelin Guide consecutively from 2011 to 2019. In 2013, Chef Kostow was awarded the James Beard Foundation Award for "Best Chef: West".

== Life and career ==
Kostow grew up in Highland Park, Illinois. An accomplished hockey player, he originally had aspirations to become a professional. In his teen years he spent three or four summers working in the kitchens of the Ravinia Music Festival on the outskirts of his native Chicago, working 14-hour days making burgers and fried chicken. After graduating from the Berkshire School, he earned a degree in philosophy from Hamilton College in New York. In 1999 he relocated to San Diego, where he worked under Trey Foshee at Georges at the Cove. He subsequently moved to France to study French cuisine. He worked at a bistro in Paris, the Michelin-starred Le Jardin des Sens in Montpelier, and in a former 14th-century abbey in Salon-de-Provence.

After gaining experience in France, Kostow returned to California, where in San Francisco he worked under Daniel Patterson at Elizabeth Daniel and Daniel Humm at Campton Place Restaurant before accepting his first executive position at Chez TJ in Mountain View, where he gained the restaurant its second Michelin star in 2007. He has been at The Restaurant at Meadowood since 2008. The Restaurant at Meadowood was awarded two Michelin stars in 2009 and then three, making him one of the youngest chefs to receive the honor. In 2013, Kostow was awarded the James Beard Foundation Award for "Best Chef: West". In June 2017, Kostow opened The Charter Oak Restaurant in St. Helena, California.

In 2010 Kostow appeared in Iron Chef America Season 8 in the episode "Battle Oatmeal" on the Food Network. In 2014 he published a cookbook, A New Napa Cuisine, which was awarded the IACP award for "Best Cookbook of the Year". The book also documents his path in life as a chef and offers an insight into his work at Meadowood. In 2018 he was awarded the international Eckart Witzigmann Award (ECKART) for "Art of Cookery".

== Style ==
Kostow has said that northern Californian cooking is about "using the best products you can locally and showcasing them as best you can. It really is that simple. California is more about this simple elemental way of cooking that is now spreading more widely." The Wall Street Journal wrote that Kostow "expresses a holistic approach to terroir and dining in a spirit similar to forebears like the French titan Michel Bras and contemporaries like René Redzepi—a point of view that encompasses the ideas of his gardeners, ceramicists, vintners and cooks, as well as the wider Napa Valley community. At Meadowood, which uses local produce, Kostow's menu includes dishes such as "oyster with kohlrabi, beef smoked in dry onion tops, cherry trout with a buckwheat skin, eel smoked over cabernet staves, lamb-stuffed Egyptian-style baladi, or a decadent egg yolk cooked in chicken fat with homemade Marmite" and "chocolate-walnut-apple pastry cup or a beeswax-candle-warmed truffled crimeaux de citeaux with honeycomb".

== Restaurants ==
- Ensue, Shenzhen, China
- The Charter Oak Restaurant, St. Helena, CA
- The Restaurant at Meadowood, Napa Valley, CA
- Chez TJ, Mountain View, CA
- Campton Place Restaurant, San Francisco, CA
- Elizabeth Daniel, San Francisco, CA
- La Terrasse, Côte d'Azur, France
- Chez Georges, Paris, France
- Le Jardin des Sens, Montpellier, France
- Georges at the Cove, La Jolla, CA

== Awards ==
- 2018 Eckart Witzigmann Award (ECKART) for "Art of Cookery"
- 2016 Wine Spectator Grand Award - The Restaurant at Meadowood
- 2013 "Best Chef: West", James Beard Foundation Award
- 2013 Three Michelin Stars, The Restaurant at Meadowood, Michelin Guide San Francisco Bay Area & Wine Country 2013
- 2013 #2 on Bon Appétit magazine's "The 20 Most Important Restaurants in America"
- 2012 Three Michelin Stars, The Restaurant at Meadowood, Michelin Guide San Francisco Bay Area & Wine Country 2012
- 2012 "Regional Champion", Time
- 2012 "Chef of the Year", Eater SF Awards 2012
- 2011 Three Michelin Stars, The Restaurant at Meadowood, Michelin Guide San Francisco Bay Area & Wine Country 2011
- 2010 Four Stars, San Francisco Chronicle
- 2010 Two Michelin Stars, The Restaurant at Meadowood, Michelin Guide San Francisco Bay Area & Wine Country 2010
- 2009 "Best New Chefs", Food & Wine
- 2009 Two Michelin Stars, The Restaurant at Meadowood, Michelin Guide San Francisco Bay Area & Wine Country 2009
- 2008 Two Michelin Stars, Chez TJ, Michelin Guide San Francisco Bay Area & Wine Country 2008
- 2007 One Michelin Star, Chez TJ, Michelin Guide San Francisco Bay Area & Wine Country 2007
