= Aitor Zabala =

Spanish chef

- Born: Aitor Lozano Zabala; 13 March 1979 (age 47); Barcelona, Spain
- Culinary career
- Rating
- Michelin Stars
- Current restaurant
- Somni (West Hollywood)

Aitor Zabala Lozano (born 13 March 1979) is a Spanish chef who owns Somni in West Hollywood, a restaurant that received three Michelin stars on 25 June 2025.

== Biography ==
Aitor, born in Barcelona, came from a family with Basque roots and a culinary tradition. His grandfather, Luis Zabala, a professional soccer player who played for Athletic Club, in Bilbao, was signed by FC Barcelona in 1941, and he moved with his family to Barcelona. Aitor's grandmother and mother worked in relevant Basque restaurants in Barcelona.

Aitor began his training at the Hoffman School of Gastronomy in Barcelona. He worked in several Spanish restaurants, such as Akelarre, Arzak, Alkimia, and El Bulli, between 2006 and 2009, eventually collaborating on Ferran Adrià's creative team. There, he met chef José Andrés, who suggested he take over the creative direction of his restaurant group in the United States.

With José Andrés, he founded the first Somni ('dream' in Catalan) at the SLS Beverly Hills hotel in 2018. The restaurant earned two Michelin stars, and Aitor was named the eighth best chef in the world in 2020 by The Best Chef Awards. In August 2020, due to the COVID-19 pandemic, the hotel and restaurant closed.

For the next five years, Zabala worked on reopening Somni with new investment partners, with the intention of opening it in 2023. However, it wasn't until 24 November 2024, that it was reopened. On 25 June 2025, at the presentation gala for the US edition of the 2025 Michelin Guide in Sacramento, it was announced that the Somni restaurant had received three stars just seven months after its reopening. With this, Zabala became the first Spanish chef to earn three stars outside of Spain. Somni and the restaurant Providence in Hollywood were simultaneously the first restaurants in Greater Los Angeles to be awarded three Michelin stars.
