= César Ramírez (chef) =

Michelin-starred chef and restaurateur

César Ramírez, is a Mexican chef and restaurateur at César, a Michelin-starred French restaurant in New York City.

== Early life ==
Ramirez was born in 1972 in Mexico and moved to Chicago at the age of four. He trained under David Bouley while working at Tru and later at Bouley. In total, Ramirez trained under Bouley for 8 years which included time spent training in Japan which influenced his style of cooking.

== Bar Blanc ==
In 2007, Cesar opened at Bar Blanc where he received 2 stars from The New York Times. During this time, Forbes Magazine named Ramirez as an up-and-coming celebrity chef. Ramirez was replaced in July 2008.

== Chef’s Table at Brooklyn Fare ==
The original location for Chef's Table at Brooklyn Fare opened in Brooklyn in 2009 and earned 2 Michelin stars in 2011 and was awarded Michelin's highest honor of 3 stars in 2012 with Ramirez as the head chef.

The restaurant would relocate in 2016 to Hell's Kitchen in Manhattan.

Ramirez was fired in July 2023 from Chef's Table.

== César ==
In July 2024, Ramirez opened a new restaurant located in SoHo, called César. It received 2 Michelin stars in its debut year.

== Awards and accolades ==
- 3 Michelin stars from 2012 to 2022 at Chef's Table at Brooklyn Fare
- 2 Michelin stars in debut year at César
- Listed in the Top 50 most powerful people in American Fine Dining by the Robb Report

== See also ==
- List of Michelin 3-star restaurants
- List of Michelin 3-star restaurants in the United States
