= Chef's Table at Brooklyn Fare =

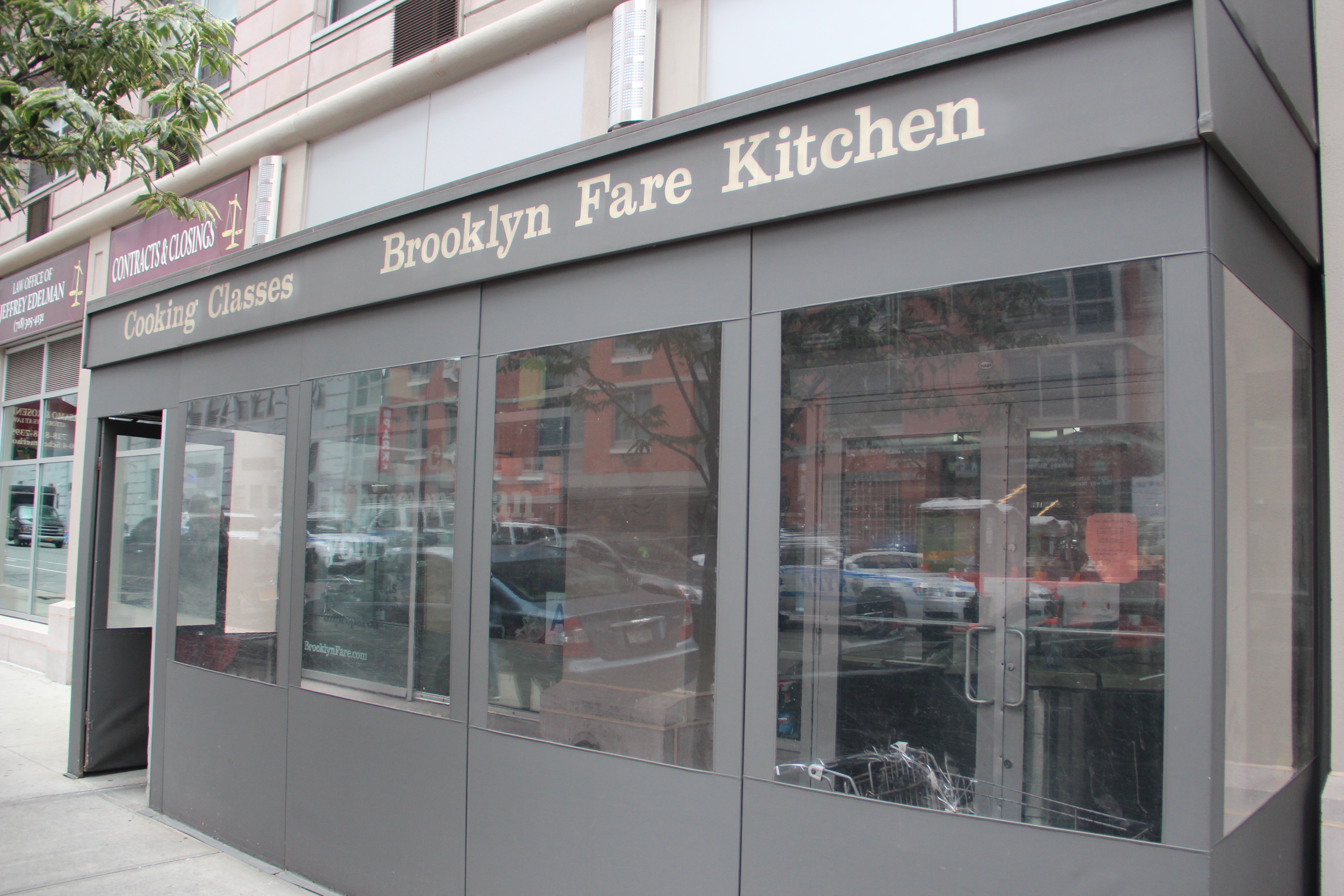
- The restaurant's original location at 200 Schermerhorn Street
- Interactive map of Chef's Table at Brooklyn Fare

Restaurant information
- Established: 2009; 17 years ago
- Owner: Moe Issa
- Chef: Max Natmessnig and Marco Prins
- Food type: Seafood-centric, Modern, Omakase-style
- Dress code: Formal attire
- Rating: (Michelin Guide); AAA Five Diamond Award (2017-2025)
- Location: 431 West 37th St, Manhattan, New York City, New York, New York, 10018, United States
- Coordinates: 40.6887°N 73.9860°W
- Seating capacity: 44
- Other information: $430 tasting menu
- Website: www.brooklynfare.com/chefs-table

Chef's Table at Brooklyn Fare is a restaurant in New York City. Originally, the restaurant was located at 200 Schermerhorn Street in Downtown Brooklyn, making it the first New York City restaurant outside Manhattan to receive 3 Michelin stars. In December 2016, the restaurant relocated to 431 West 37th Street in the Hell's Kitchen neighborhood of Manhattan.

== Restaurant ==
Moe Issa opened the original location in Brooklyn next to a grocery store with the original head chef César Ramírez. The establishment seated up to 18 guests around a counter. The restaurant expects guests to refrain from note taking, picture taking, or cell phone use inside. Although it is hard to get reservations at the restaurant, there are regulars. The wait for a reservation is up to six weeks. The person in charge of reservations has been stalked by strangers who beg for an earlier reservation.

The food is inspired by Japanese dishes which is "all about the ingredients, the freshness, and always very simple." There are 24 courses, including canapés, cheeses, soups, and desserts. There is no choice of what the courses are. Chef's Table at Brooklyn Fare uses around 900 serving pieces each night. Ramírez introduces each course by listing the ingredients. When the food is served by the chefs, Ramírez watches the guests eat.

In December 2016, the restaurant relocated to the Hell's Kitchen section of Manhattan located in the rear of a grocery store.

== Reception ==
The restaurant has been well received. It is ranked No. 55 on The World's 50 Best Restaurants' expanded list, and in 2011 was awarded three stars out of four by The New York Times restaurant critic Sam Sifton.

Jean-Luc Naret, former director of the Michelin Guide, and his wife came in the restaurant and were surprised at what they saw. When Ramírez received a call about the restaurant receiving its first two stars, he said that he could not believe it. Naret said that his call to Ramírez, which he kept for last, was his most beautiful call that day. He also called it one of the greatest restaurants in New York and thought it to be one of the 300 greatest in the world. The restaurant received a third star in 2011 and retained the rating before losing all three after closing and reopening under a new head chef in 2023.

Praise has not been unanimous. Tanya Gold, the restaurant critic for The Spectator, described the restaurant's website as "the most explicitly controlling—okay, rude—that I have ever encountered", and its personnel as "narcissistic paranoiacs who love tiny little fish and will share them with you for money". "If you want an experience like the one on offer at Chef's Table at Brooklyn Fare," she wrote, "then put a dead fish on your kitchen table and punch yourself repeatedly in the face, then write yourself a bill for $425.29 (including wine). That should do it."

Richard Vines of Bloomberg Markets commented that the restaurant is hard to find.

== Controversy ==
In 2014, the restaurant faced a class-action lawsuit regarding Chef Ramirez's alleged anti-Asian statements and policies.

Beginning July 2023, the restaurant closed due to a legal dispute between Chef Ramirez and the owner Moneer Issa. Ramirez claimed that he was fired abruptly after noticing Issa embezzling $400,000 in funds. Issa claimed that he was "safeguarding" the funds, and that Ramirez had stolen kitchen equipment and rare wines from the restaurant, as well as exposing it to liability through abusive behavior to employees and customers. The restaurant reopened in October 2023, under chefs Max Natmessnig and Marco Prins, while the lawsuit continued.

On November 7, 2023, Michelin announced that it had revoked the restaurant's stars as a result of the ongoing dispute and organizational changes. While restaurants can retain stars through changing chefs, Michelin treated the change, along with the restaurant's closure and reopening, as the establishment of an essentially new restaurant.

== See also ==
- List of Michelin 3-star restaurants
- List of Michelin 3-star restaurants in the United States
- List of Michelin-starred restaurants in New York City
