= Californios (restaurant) =

Michelin-starred Mexican restaurant in San Francisco, California

- Interactive map of Californios

Restaurant information
- Established: January 2015; 11 years ago
- Owners: Val M. Cantu; Carolyn Cantu; Charlotte Randolph
- Head chef: Val M. Cantu
- Food type: Mexican and northern California
- Rating: (2026) (2017–2025) (2015–2017)
- Location: 355 11th Street, SoMa (2021–present); 3115 22nd Street, Mission District (2015–2020), San Francisco, San Francisco, California, 94103 (2021–present); 94110 (2015–2020), United States
- Coordinates: 37.77141°N 122.41296°W
- Seating capacity: ≤50 (2021–present); 24 (2015–2021)

Californios is a Michelin-starred restaurant in San Francisco, California, serving Mexican cuisine. Its head chef is Val M. Cantú, one of the restaurant's co-owners. Californios earned its first Michelin star in 2015 and its second in 2017, becoming the first US restaurant serving Mexican cuisine to earn two Michelin stars. In 2026 it was awarded a third star, becoming the first Mexican restaurant in the world with three Michelin stars. Its original Mission District location closed in 2020. The restaurant relocated to the South of Market (SoMa) neighborhood in early 2021.

== History ==
Val M. Cantu ran a series of Mexican pop-up restaurants called Californios for two years. He then opened the permanent location using the same name in the Mission District in January 2015. Californios's seating capacity was eighteen in the dining room and six at the chef's counter. The interior design was dark, and windows were tinted.

Amid the COVID-19 pandemic, Californios's original location closed in 2020. The restaurant in early 2021 was relocated to the South of Market (SoMa) neighborhood.

The restaurant's capacity was doubled to about fifty seats later that year. The SoMa location's size is 4,959 sq ft (460.7 m^{2}), including an 1,742 sq ft (161.8 m^{2}) outdoor patio.

== Menu ==
Cantu's family ran a Mexican restaurant in Brownwood, Texas, where he was raised. His recipes have blended Mexican and northern Californian cuisines and have been inspired by his "Nani" Rosa. The menu is prix fixe and changes in response to seasonal availability of ingredients.

== Reception ==
Californios received its first Michelin star in October 2015 and its second in October 2017, becoming the first Mexican restaurant in the US to earn two Michelin stars. Until June 2026, it had remained the only two-Michelin-starred Mexican restaurant in the US. On June 24, 2026, the restaurant earned its third star, making it the first ever Mexican restaurant in the world with three Michelin stars.

== Chef and restaurateur ==
Val M. Cantu graduated in 2006 from the University of Texas at Austin, where he studied business and English literature. Cantu began his hospitality career by working for a Japanese restaurant Uchi in Austin, Texas, and worked for other restaurants, such as a Mexican restaurant Pujol in Mexico City and a California-inspired restaurant Sons & Daughters as a sous chef in San Francisco. While working for Uchi, he attended Austin Community College.

Cantu, his wife Carolyn, and his sister-in-law Charlotte Randolph, beverage director of Californios and former employee of another restaurant The French Laundry, have co-owned the restaurant throughout its run in old and new locations.

Food & Wine magazine named him one of "Best New Chefs" of 2017.

== See also ==
- List of Michelin 3-star restaurants in the United States
- List of Michelin-starred restaurants in California
