= Somni =

Restaurant in West Hollywood, California, U.S.

- Interactive map of Somni

Restaurant information
- Owner: Aitor Zabala
- Head chef: Aitor Zabala
- Chef: Ismael Parra
- Food type: Contemporary; Spanish
- Dress code: Business casual
- Rating: (Michelin Guide)
- Location: 9045 Nemo Street, West Hollywood, California, United States
- Coordinates: 34°4′57″N 118°23′20″W
- Seating capacity: 14-seat counter
- Website: somnirestaurant.com

Somni is a restaurant in West Hollywood, California, United States. It initially opened Beverly Hills, California in 2018, then closed in 2020 during the COVID-19 pandemic. In November 2024, it reopened in West Hollywood, and, in June 2025, it became the first restaurant along with Providence in Greater Los Angeles to win three Michelin stars. With a starting price of $645 per person, it is the most expensive restaurant in Los Angeles.

== History ==
Aitor Zabala and José Andrés founded the first Somni ('dream' in Catalan) at the SLS Beverly Hills hotel in 2018. The restaurant earned two Michelin stars, and Aitor was named the eighth best chef in the world in 2020 by The Best Chef Awards. In August 2020, due to the COVID-19 pandemic, the hotel and restaurant closed.

For the next five years, Zabala worked on reopening Somni with new investment partners, with the intention of opening it in 2023. However, it wasn't until November 24, 2024 that it reopened. On June 25, 2025, at the presentation gala for the California edition of the 2025 Michelin Guide, Somni received three stars just seven months after its reopening. Somni and Providence in Hollywood were simultaneously the first restaurants in Greater Los Angeles to be awarded three Michelin stars.

== See also ==
- List of Michelin 3-star restaurants in the United States
- List of Michelin-starred restaurants in California
