= Addison (restaurant) =

- Interactive map of Addison

Restaurant information
- Established: September 6, 2006; 19 years ago
- Chef: William Bradley
- Food type: California Cuisine
- Rating: (Michelin Guide); AAA Five Diamond Award (2008-2025)
- Location: 5200 Grand Del Mar Way, San Diego, California, 92130, United States
- Coordinates: 32°56′29.5″N 117°11′56.5″W
- Reservations: Required for tasting menu
- Other information: $365 10-course tasting menu
- Website: www.addisondelmar.com

Addison is a restaurant in San Diego, California, that showcases California gastronomy from Chef William Bradley. It was the first three Michelin-star restaurant in Southern California. Opened in 2006, it is located in Carmel Valley, adjacent to Fairmont Grand Del Mar.The restaurant is named after famed architect Addison Mizner, who specialized in Mediterranean-style architecture.

== Awards and recognition ==
Addison earned its first Michelin star in 2019, second star in 2021 and third star in 2022, becoming the first Southern California restaurant with the designation. As of the 2023 Michelin Guide, it is among 13 three-star Michelin restaurants in the United States and 142 in the world.

La Liste ranked Addison #12 in the U.S. within their 2023 list.

== See also ==
- List of Michelin-starred restaurants in California
- List of Michelin 3-star restaurants
- List of Michelin 3-star restaurants in the United States
