= Baumé (restaurant) =

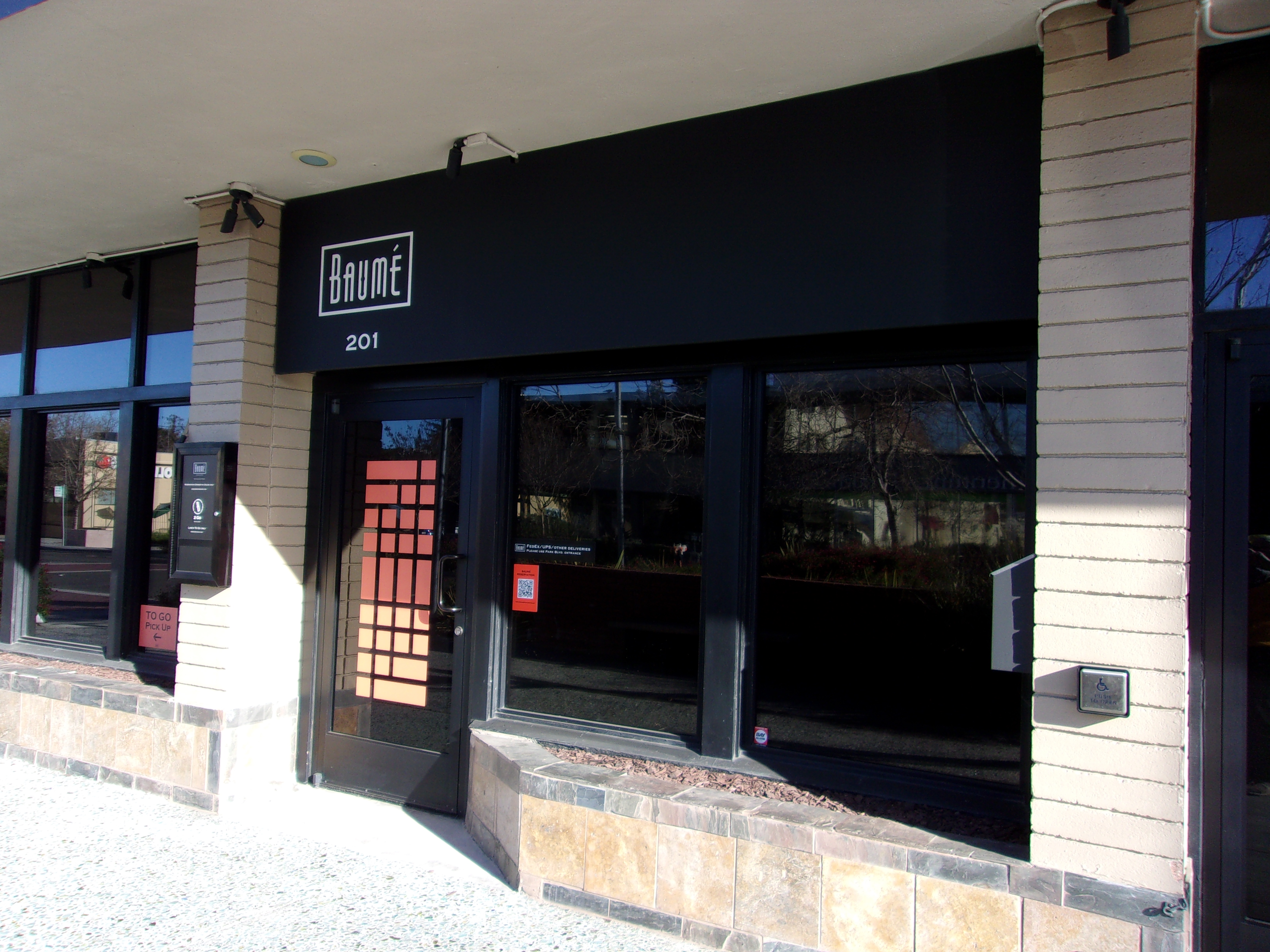
- Interactive map of Baumé

Restaurant information
- Established: 2010; 16 years ago
- Closed: August 12, 2023; 3 years ago
- Owners: Bruno Chemel, Bechamel S corporation
- Head chef: Bruno Chemel
- Food type: Modern French
- Location: 201 California Ave, Palo Alto, California, United States
- Coordinates: 37°25′41″N 122°8′35″W
- Website: www.maisonbaume.com

Baumé was a French restaurant in Palo Alto, California, opened in 2010 by chef Bruno Chemel. Until 2021, it had two Michelin stars. Originally seating 28, the restaurant was reduced to eight tables in the mid-2010s, and staffed only by Chemel, his son Antoine, and his wife Christie. In 2021, Chemel requested the Michelin stars be withdrawn, and in 2022 he converted the restaurant into a more casual Bistronomie by Baumé. It closed permanently in August 2023.

== History ==
Chemel, who had worked as a chef at Michelin-starred restaurants in France, was head chef at Chez TJ in Mountain View beginning in early 2008; after it earned two Michelin stars in 2009, he left at the end of the year and in 2010 opened Baumé in nearby Palo Alto. The restaurant initially seated 22, later 28; in the mid-2010s, Chemel reduced seating, reduced his staff, and as of 2021 he and his wife, Christie, run the restaurant alone, with a single evening service of eight tables four nights a week. Their son has assisted in the kitchen.

Baumé was awarded a Michelin star in its first year and a second star in 2011 and every following year until 2021, when it did not receive a star. In an interview in 2017, Chemel said that he aspired to earn a third star, but in 2021 he said he had asked Michelin to remove Baumé from its guide because as an essentially private restaurant, it no longer fit the company's "guidelines".

In February 2022, Chemel announced that he would close Baumé and reopen it on March 8, 2022, as Bistronomie by Baumé. He explained his decision to rebrand as an opportunity for a fresh start with a less expensive menu: "In the spirit of bistronomy, I see an opportunity to serve high-level meals at lower prices in a more relaxed environment."

Bistronomie by Baumé closed permanently after serving its last customers on August 12, 2023.

== Menu ==
Baumé specialized in French gastronomy. In a local listing, Chemel described it as "French Cuisine Moderne with a Zen Touch"; his training included studying macrobiotic cooking in Japan. At its inception, it was known for molecular gastronomy; it was named after the chemist Antoine Baumé, inventor of the Baumé scale for measuring the density of liquids. By 2015, this emphasis had lessened. As of 2021 Baumé had a pescatarian and a Wagyu beef tasting menu, and a mandated wine pairing. In summer 2020, during the COVID-19 pandemic, the restaurant began offering a four-course take-out menu.

== See also ==
- List of defunct restaurants of the United States
- List of French restaurants
- List of Michelin-starred restaurants in California
