= Michael Cimarusti =

American chef

- Education: The Culinary Institute of America
- Known for: Sustainable Wild Seafood Advocacy
- Spouse: Cristina Echiverri
- Culinary career
- Rating
- Michelin Stars
- Current restaurant
- Providence (Hollywood)
- Previous restaurants
- Best Girl; Connie & Ted's; Il Pesce Cucina at Eataly L.A.

Michael Cimarusti is an American chef who owns Michelin-starred Providence restaurant in Los Angeles. He won the James Beard Award for Best Chef: West in 2019.

== Background ==
Originally from New Brunswick, New Jersey, Cimarusti's culinary career began at an early age inspired by his grandmother's and great-grandmother's cooking. He graduated with honors in 1991 from the Culinary Institute of America in Hyde Park, New York. His first professional experience as a chef came after graduation, cooking at An American Place with Chef Larry Forgione.

He first came to Los Angeles when he had the opportunity to work for Wolfgang Puck as chef de cuisine at the chef’s original restaurant, Spago. Cimarusti also worked notable stints at fine-dining institutions in the U.S. and abroad including Osteria del Circo in Midtown Manhattan, New York, at which he served as opening chef de cuisine; the Michelin three-starred Arpège with Chef Alain Passard in Paris; and Le Cirque, the Manhattan establishment by Sirio Maccioni, at which he had the opportunity to cook with renowned French chefs Paul Bocuse, Roger Vergé, and Gérard Boyer. For six years he worked as executive chef at Downtown LA's Water Grill, earning excellent reviews.

== Providence and Connie & Ted's ==
Cimarusti was approached by Patina founder Joachim Splichal, who offered him the head role at Patina’s new Disney Concert Hall location. Instead, Cimarusti told him his real ambition was to open his own restaurant. A few months later, Splichal offered him the former Patina space on Melrose Avenue to open his restaurant. In 2005, Cimarusti founded Providence. Providence retained two Michelin stars since 2008 and earning the Green Michelin Star for its dedication to sustainable practices. In 2025, the restaurant was elevated to three Michelin stars—one of only two in Los Angeles to uphold Michelin star status for over 15 consecutive years. In 2013 he opened, Connie & Ted's in West Hollywood, California, a casual New England-style eatery. It closed in July 2026.

== Awards and accolades ==
- James Beard Award for Best Chef: West (2019)
- 3 Michelin stars from the Michelin Guide for Providence
- A Green Michelin star
- Robb Report as one of the 50 Most Powerful People in American Fine Dining

== Personal life ==
Cimarusti and his wife Cristina Echiverri met while he worked for Forgione.

== See also ==
- List of Michelin-starred restaurants in California
