= William Bradley (chef) =

American chef

- Culinary career
- Current restaurant: Addison

William Bradley is an American chef and restaurateur best known for his three Michelin-starred restaurant Addison in San Diego, California, United States.

== Early years ==
Bradley was born and raised in Chula Vista, California.

== Addison ==
Bradley is the founding chef at Addison since the restaurant debuted in September 2006. In 2019, Michelin Guide expanded to review all of California and Addison received its first Michelin star. In 2021, it received its second Michelin star (there was no Michelin Guide in 2020 in California) and in 2022 it received its third Michelin star, becoming the first Southern California restaurant to receive 3 stars.

== Awards ==
- 3 Michelin stars
- 2023 candidate for the Best Chef Awards
- Winner of Robb Report “Culinary Masters Competition”, nominated by Thomas Keller
