= Providence (restaurant) =

Restaurant in Hollywood, Los Angeles, California, U.S.

- Interactive map of Providence

Restaurant information
- Established: June 17, 2005; 21 years ago
- Owners: Michael Cimarusti; Donato Poto
- Head chef: Michael Cimarusti
- Chef: Tristan Aitchison
- Food type: Seafood
- Dress code: Business casual
- Rating: (Michelin Guide); *AAA Five Diamond Award (2019-2025)
- Location: 5955 Melrose Avenue, Los Angeles, Los Angeles, California, 90038, United States
- Coordinates: 34°5′1″N 118°19′48.3″W
- Other information: Classic tasting menu or chef's tasting menu
- Website: www.providencela.com

Providence is a Michelin-starred restaurant in Hollywood, California, United States. Providence and Somni, in West Hollywood, were the first restaurants in Greater Los Angeles to receive three Michelin stars.

== History ==
Chef Michael Cimarusti was approached by Patina founder Joachim Splichal, who offered him the head role at Patina's new Walt Disney Concert Hall location. Instead, Cimarusti told him his real ambition was to open his own restaurant. A few months later, Splichal offered him the former Patina space on Melrose Avenue to open his restaurant. In June 2005, Cimarusti founded Providence. Originally, the restaurant offered an à la carte menu, and two tasting menus. One tasting menu was called the California coastline, focusing on all things California and the other menu was more all-encompassing of seafood. The menu offerings pared down and evolved over the years and today, they serve one menu and a vegetarian option.

== Design ==
The dining space was redesigned in 2023 by Los Angeles-based creative design team Bells + Whistles and features hand-blown glass ‘Sea Clouds’ made of 26 free-form glass globes applied with silvering. The restaurant's sea-inspired theme has the hand-finished walls plastered in eight different shades of blue, green, and warm sand tones to create an ombré effect. The carpeting is meant to emulate wave ripples and complements the artwork. There are also walnut tables and a hand-hewn walnut bar.

The restaurant features a rooftop garden where it grows herbs and edible flowers along with keeping Italian honeybee hives which produces nectar used in the post-dinner tea service.

== Awards and accolades ==
- 2008: One Michelin star by the Michelin Guide
- 2009 and 2019-2024: Two Michelin stars by the Michelin Guide (Note: The Michelin Guide did not review the Los Angeles area from 2010-2018)
- 2013-2025: Included on the Los Angeles Times 101 Best Restaurants List
- 2025-present: Three Michelin stars by the Michelin Guide
- 2025: Providence ranked 47th in the world in The World's 50 Best Restaurants

== See also ==
- List of Michelin 3-star restaurants in the United States
- List of Michelin-starred restaurants in California
