= The Restaurant at Meadowood =

Michelin 3-star; Napa Valley, California

Coordinates: 38°31′20″N 122°28′2″W

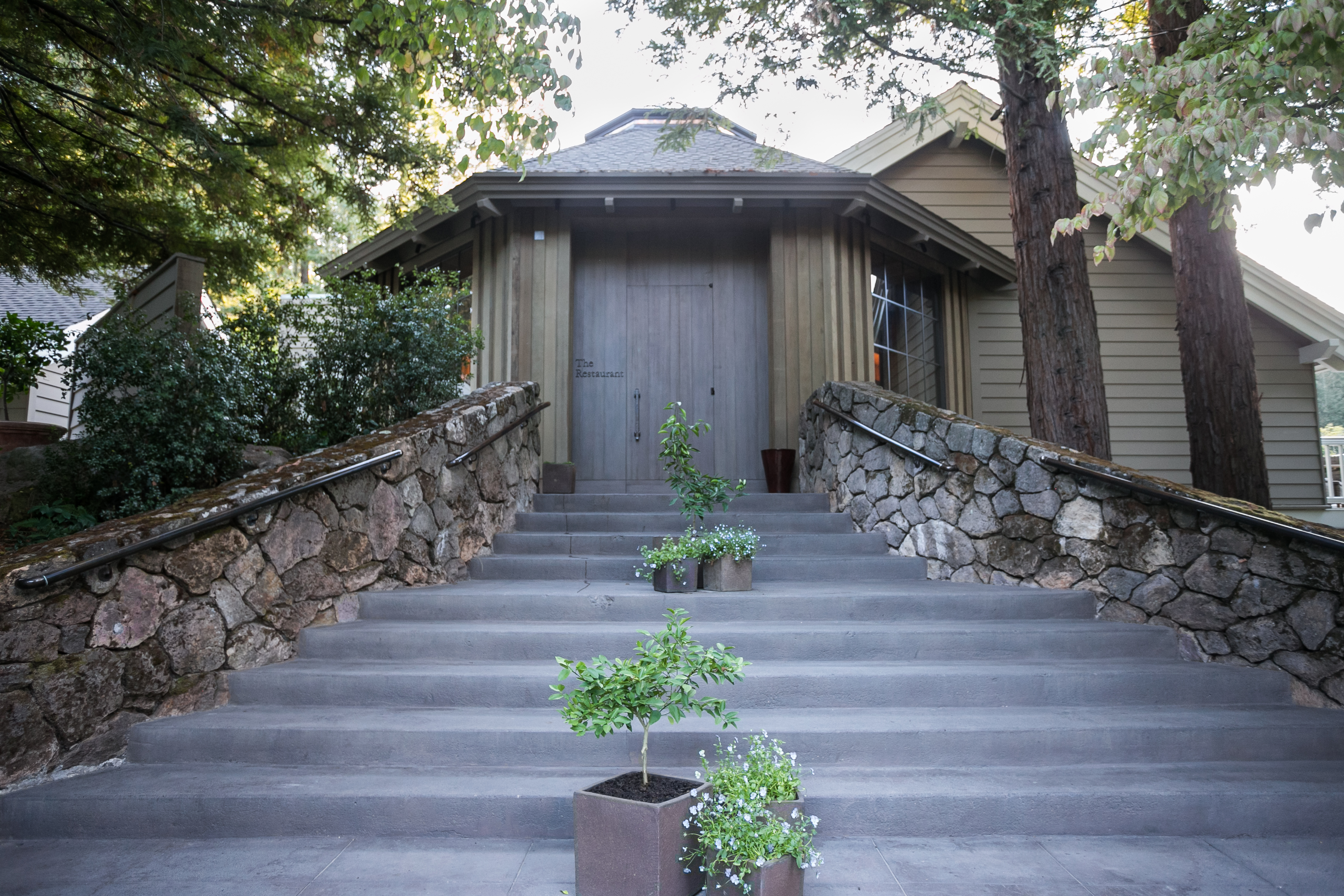
- Exterior of Meadowood
- Interactive map of The Restaurant at Meadowood

Restaurant information
- Closed: 2020; 6 years ago
- Head chef: Christopher Kostow
- Chef: Jacqueline Dasha
- Food type: Ingredient driven, California, New American
- Dress code: Jacket recommended
- Rating: Michelin Guide, 2013
- Location: 900 Meadowood Lane, St. Helena, CA, 94574, United States
- Reservations: Yes
- Website: https://www.therestaurantatmeadowood.com

The Restaurant at Meadowood was a Michelin Guide 3-star restaurant at the Meadowood Napa Valley resort in Napa Valley, California which specialized in local, sustainable California cuisine. The restaurant applied a "slightly more modern approach" with the use of emulsifiers, gelling agents and stabilizers.

On September 28, 2020, The Restaurant at Meadowood was destroyed in the Glass Fire. In the immediate aftermath of the fire, the resort owners said they intend to ultimately rebuild the restaurant. Since the fire, the restaurant staff has been establishing temporary residencies and serving dinners at a few places around California and the United States, including the Ojai Valley Inn in Southern California.

== Awards ==
- 2013 Three Michelin Stars, Michelin Guide San Francisco Bay Area & Wine Country 2013
- 2013 #2 on Bon Appétit magazine's “The 20 Most Important Restaurants in America”
- 2012 Three Michelin Stars, Michelin Guide San Francisco Bay Area & Wine Country 2012
- 2011 Three Michelin Stars, Michelin Guide San Francisco Bay Area & Wine Country 2011
- 2010 Four Stars, San Francisco Chronicle
- 2010 Two Michelin Stars, Michelin Guide San Francisco Bay Area & Wine Country 2010
- 2009 Two Michelin Stars, Michelin Guide San Francisco Bay Area & Wine Country 2009
- 2008 Two Michelin Stars, Michelin Guide San Francisco Bay Area & Wine Country 2008

== See also ==
- List of defunct restaurants of the United States
- List of Michelin 3-star restaurants
- List of Michelin 3-star restaurants in the United States
- List of Michelin-starred restaurants in California
