= Jean-Luc Naret =

French businessman (born 1961)

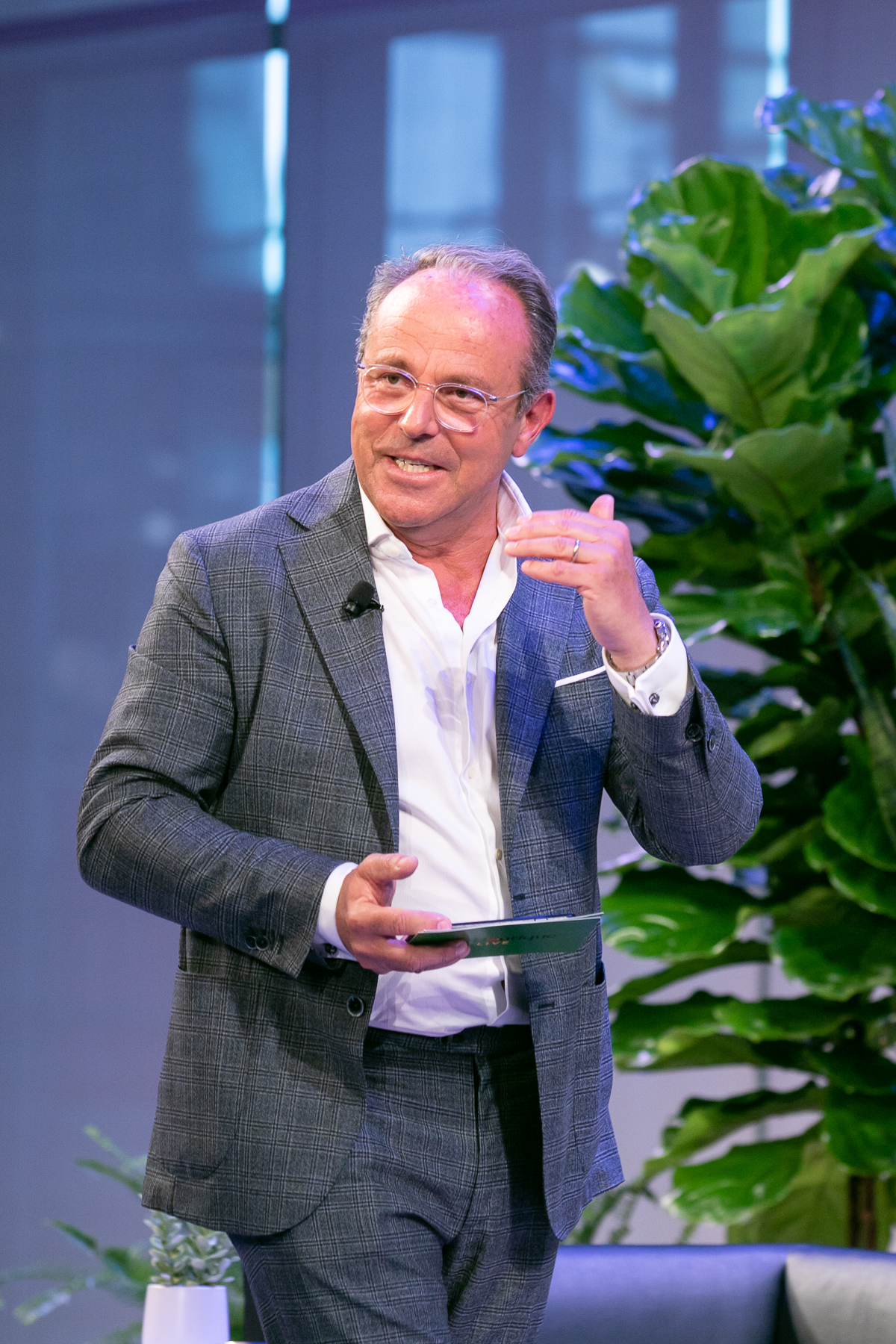
- Naret at the Times Center (New York) in June 2019
- Born: 1961 (age 63–64); Paris, France
- Occupation: Hotelier

Jean-Luc Naret is a French hotelier specialized in luxury hospitality. He was previously Directeur Général of the Michelin Guide, a famous annual publication featuring a three-star rating of international gourmet restaurants. He managed many luxury hotels worldwide and used to be CEO of La Reserve Hotels in Europe. He founded his consultancy in 2019.

== Biography ==
Naret was born in Paris, France, in 1961. He studied hospitality at Ecole Hoteliere Jean Drouant (Paris) from 1976 to 1979.

At the age of 21, he started working in the Venice Simplon Orient Express and soon became Train manager. In the following years, he took on further responsibilities in the hotel business, from manager to managing director and CEO of hotels and palaces such as: Hôtel Le Bristol Paris, the Sandy Lane in Barbados, the Residence on Mauritius, the Trianon Palace in Versailles and Sun International's Saint Géran on Mauritius.

In 2002–2003, Naret became Vice President of Operations for Aga Khan's Serena Hotels and Resorts. Directly reporting to His Highness the Aga Kahn, his missions entailed developing the tourism sector. During that time, Naret launched new projects for the group.

=== Michelin guides ===
From 2003 to 2011, Naret was the managing director, then CEO, of the Michelin Guide, a series of influential guide books published by the French company Michelin for more than a century and that can have dramatic effects on the success of a restaurant. Under his leadership, the guide books and the brand grew internationally, with new destinations and new Michelin Starred Chefs around the world, in particular: New York City, San Francisco, Los Angeles, Las Vegas, Chicago, Tokyo, Kyoto, Osaka, Hong Kong or Macau. The Los Angeles and Las Vegas guides were discontinued after two years following low sales and criticism of the guides for misunderstanding the Los Angeles food scene. Naret in turn stated "the people in Los Angeles are not real foodies. They are not too interested in eating well but just in who goes to which restaurant and where they sit.".

=== Since Michelin ===
In 2021, he was appointed CEO at The Set Collection, a collection of luxury hotels around the globe.

After Michelin, he became the CEO of La Reserve Hotels & Spas in Paris, Ramatuelle, Zurich and Geneva.

Since 2019, he founded JLN & Co – Creative Minds, a consultancy specialized in luxury lifestyle.

He regularly speaks at events worldwide on the topics of hospitality and high-quality restaurants.

In 2007, Naret was presented with the highest civilian distinction in France, Légion d'honneur, for his contribution to the travel industry.
