= Birdsong (restaurant) =

Restaurant in San Francisco, California, U.S.

Coordinates: 37°46′46″N 122°24′37.5″W

- Interactive map of Birdsong

Restaurant information
- Head chef: Christopher Bleidorn
- Food type: Contemporary
- Rating: (Michelin Guide)
- Location: 1085 Mission Street, San Francisco, California, 94103
- Website: www.birdsongsf.com

Birdsong is a Michelin Guide-starred restaurant in San Francisco, in the U.S. state of California.

== See also ==
- List of Michelin-starred restaurants in California
