= Dominique Crenn =

French chef (born 1965)

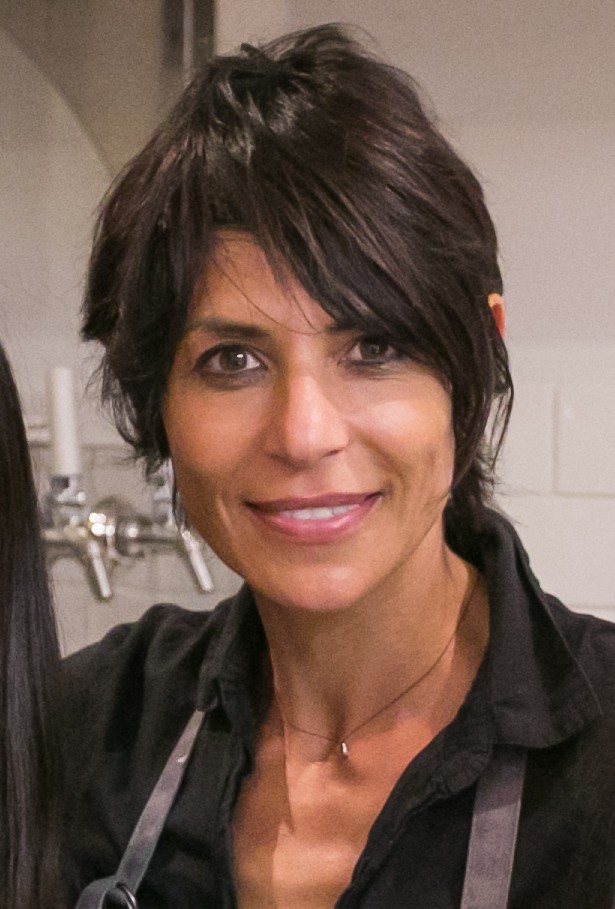
- Crenn in 2013
- Born: 7 April 1965 (age 61); Saint-Germain-en-Laye, Yvelines, France
- Spouse: Maria Bello (m. 2024; sep. 2025)
- Children: 2
- Culinary career
- Cooking style: French cuisine
- Rating
- 3 Michelin stars
- Current restaurant
- Atelier Crenn

Dominique Crenn (French pronunciation: [dɔminik kʁɛn]; born 7 April 1965) is a French chef. As of 2018, she was the only female chef in the United States to attain three Michelin stars, for her restaurant Atelier Crenn in San Francisco. Crenn has been featured in several Food Network and other television shows.

== Early life and education ==
Crenn, originally from Locronan, was adopted at 18 months by a French couple from Versailles. She spent many summers in Brittany at the family farm. Her mother, a cook with an "adventurous palate", took her young daughter to experience Indian, Chinese, Japanese, and Vietnamese restaurants in Paris." Her father, a politician, would take his daughter along when he dined at Michelin star restaurants with his friend, a food critic for Le Télégramme.

Crenn's experience on the family farm, her mother's cooking, and her visits to high-profile restaurants developed her culinary tastes. Disliking the male-dominated French culinary scene, she earned a bachelor's degree in economics and a master's degree in international business.

== Career ==
Crenn moved to the United States to pursue her culinary aspirations, landing in San Francisco, California in the late 1980s. Her first restaurant position was at Stars, a prominent restaurant in the city run by celebrity chef Jeremiah Tower. After two years, she moved on to work at restaurants such as Campton Place, 2223 Market, and Yoyo Bistro at the Miyako Hotel before taking a position as head chef for the restaurant in Intercontinental Hotel in Jakarta, Indonesia. She was Indonesia's first ever female head chef, but was forced to flee the country during civil unrest in 1998.

Returning to the United States, she became executive chef for Manhattan Country Club in Manhattan Beach, Los Angeles, California and then at Abode Restaurant and Lounge in Santa Monica, California. In 2008, management at Intercontinental Hotel offered her a new position, and she joined Luce in San Francisco where she was awarded her first Michelin star in 2009, and was awarded another one-star ranking the next year.

In 2009, Crenn competed on The Next Iron Chef but was eliminated in the Adaptability Challenge, reaching 7th place overall in the season. In 2010, Crenn competed on Iron Chef America against chef Michael Symon, winning the battle.

In 2011, she opened her restaurant Atelier Crenn in San Francisco. The Michelin Guide awarded the restaurant a two-star ranking, making Crenn the first ever female chef to receive two stars in the United States. Atelier Crenn was again awarded two stars in 2014. She was awarded the Best Female Chef Award in 2016 by The World's 50 Best Restaurants. Crenn appeared on Season 2 of Chef's Table, a documentary film series on Netflix. In 2018, Crenn earned her third Michelin star.

Petit Crenn, inspired by the food of her childhood in Brittany, opened in 2015; it closed in September 2024 when its lease expired. In 2016, Crenn announced plans to open Bar Crenn, a wine bar featuring small plates, next door to Atelier Crenn. In March 2018, Bar Crenn opened, earning one Michelin star in its first year, which means Crenn currently holds four Michelin stars. In 2018, Crenn was awarded the James Beard Foundation Award of Best Chef: West.

In 2021, Crenn joined the creative team on the dark comedy horror film The Menu, serving as a consultant for Ralph Fiennes' character Chef Julian Slowik and creating the dishes showcased throughout the film. In 2022, Crenn was featured as an Iron Chef on the Netflix show Iron Chef: Quest for an Iron Legend.

Crenn was named one of the 100 most influential people in the world by Time magazine in 2024.

=== Cooking philosophy ===
Crenn sees herself as an artist, referring to her dishes as "poetic culinaria." Katie McLaughlin notes in a profile of Crenn for The Wall Street Journal that Atelier Crenn "serves a cuisine so visually, texturally, and conceptually inventive it has both delighted and baffled critics and drawn international attention."

Crenn is known to treat her staff well, avoiding the yelling and scrutiny that was common in professional kitchens for decades. She is also known to greet her guests, walking from table to table to do so.

== Personal life ==
In December 2019, Crenn became engaged to her girlfriend, actress Maria Bello. They married on May 12, 2024. Bello filed for divorce in May 2025.

== Bibliography ==
Nonfiction

- Rebel chef : in search of what matters. New York: Penguin Press. 2020. ISBN 9780735224742.
- Atelier Crenn : metamorphosis of taste. New York: Houghton Mifflin Harcourt. 2015. ISBN 9780544444676.
