= Atelier Crenn =

Coordinates: 37.7983°N 122.4358°W

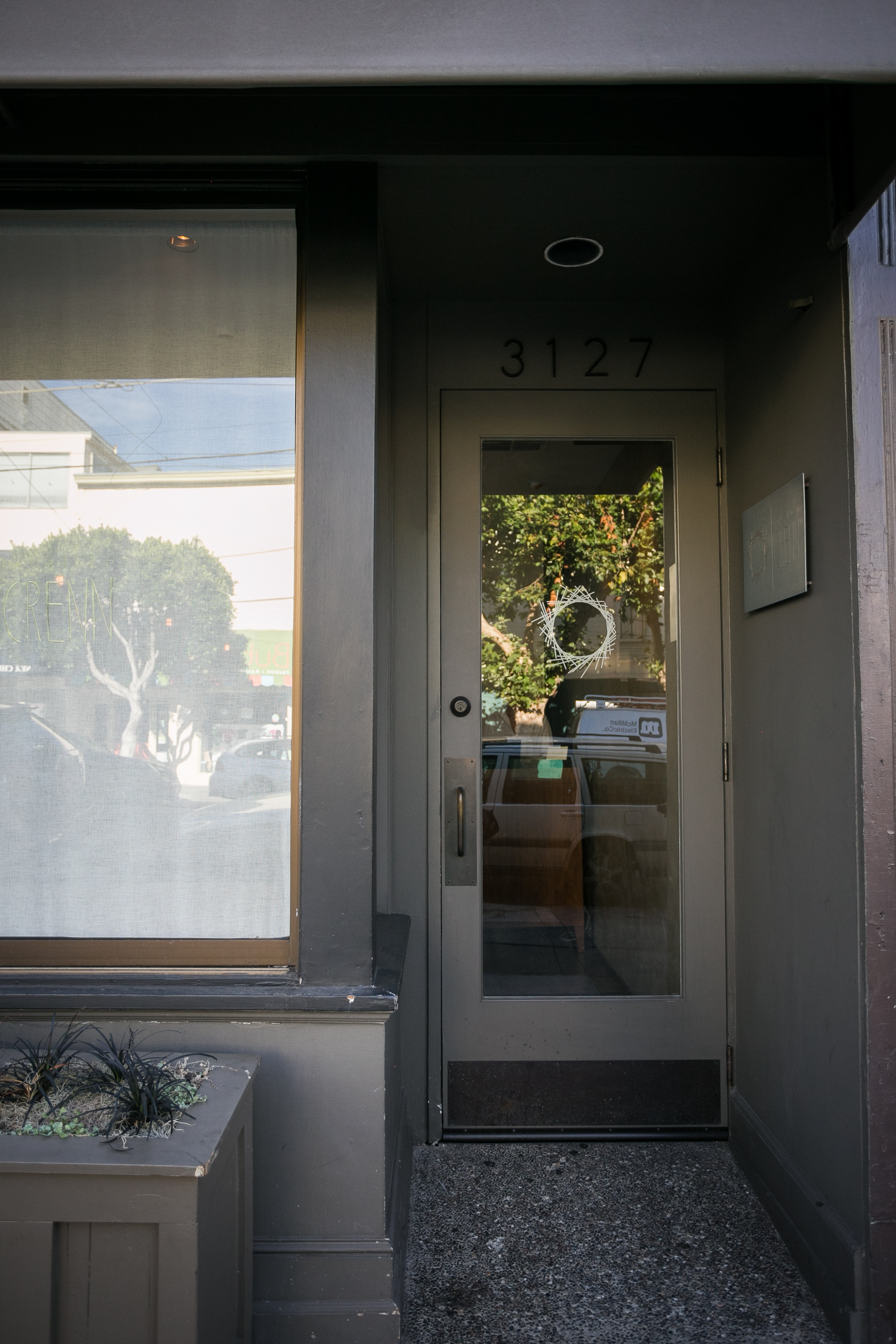
- Atelier Crenn entrance (2013)
- Interactive map of Atelier Crenn

Restaurant information
- Established: 2011; 15 years ago
- Head chef: Dominique Crenn and Juan Contreras
- Food type: French
- Rating: (Michelin Guide)
- Location: 3127 Fillmore St, San Francisco, California, 94123, United States
- Website: www.ateliercrenn.com

Atelier Crenn (French: [atəlje kʁɛn]) is a French restaurant in the Cow Hollow neighborhood of San Francisco, California. Opened in 2011 by Dominique Crenn and Juan Contreras, the restaurant became the seventh restaurant in the San Francisco Bay Area to be awarded three Michelin stars by the Michelin Guide in 2018.

== History ==
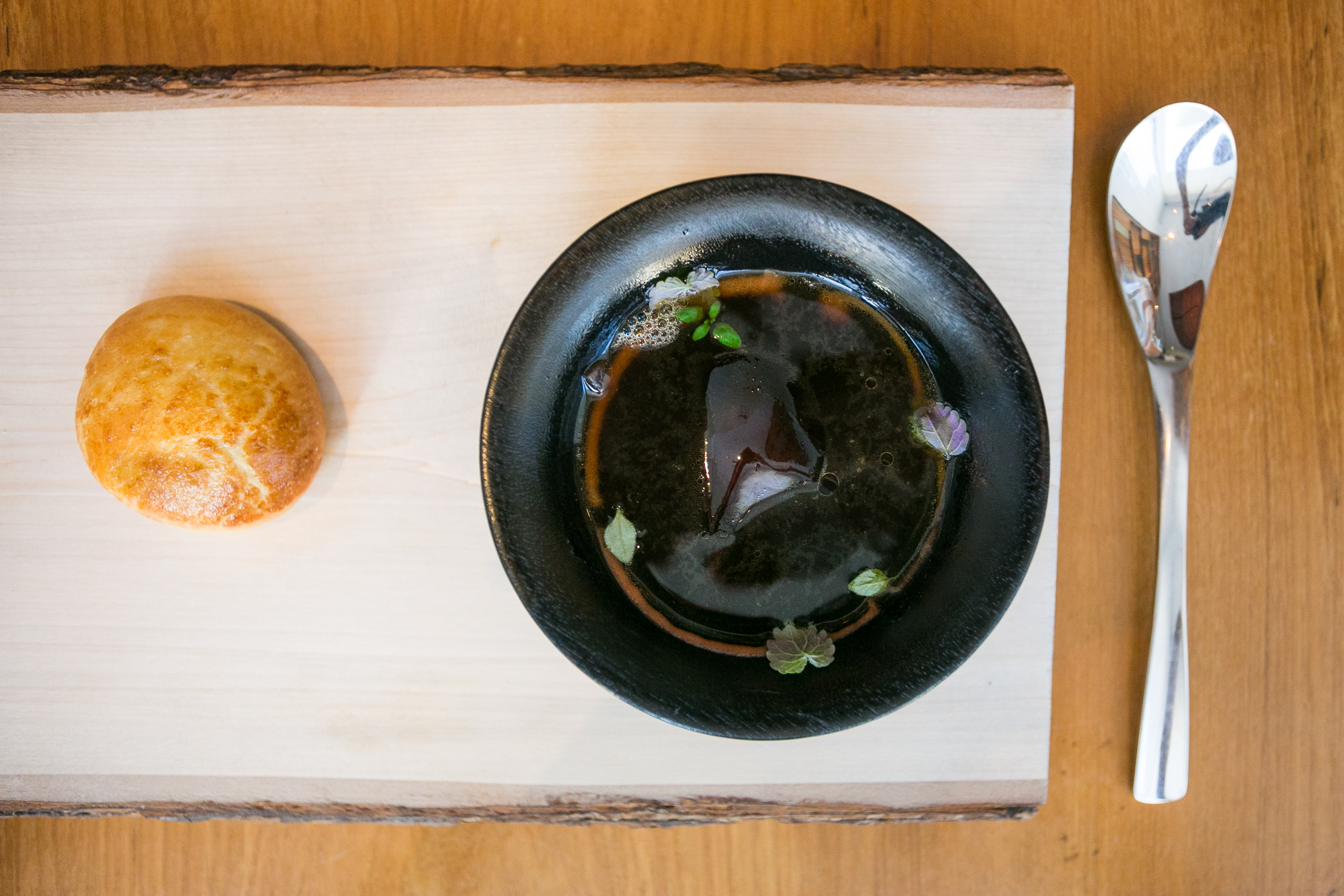
Course number six at Atelier Crenn, called "The half moon, silky and smoky". This is a charred onion soup.

Atelier Crenn opened in January 2011. The restaurant is a homage to chef Dominique Crenn's father.

== Menu ==
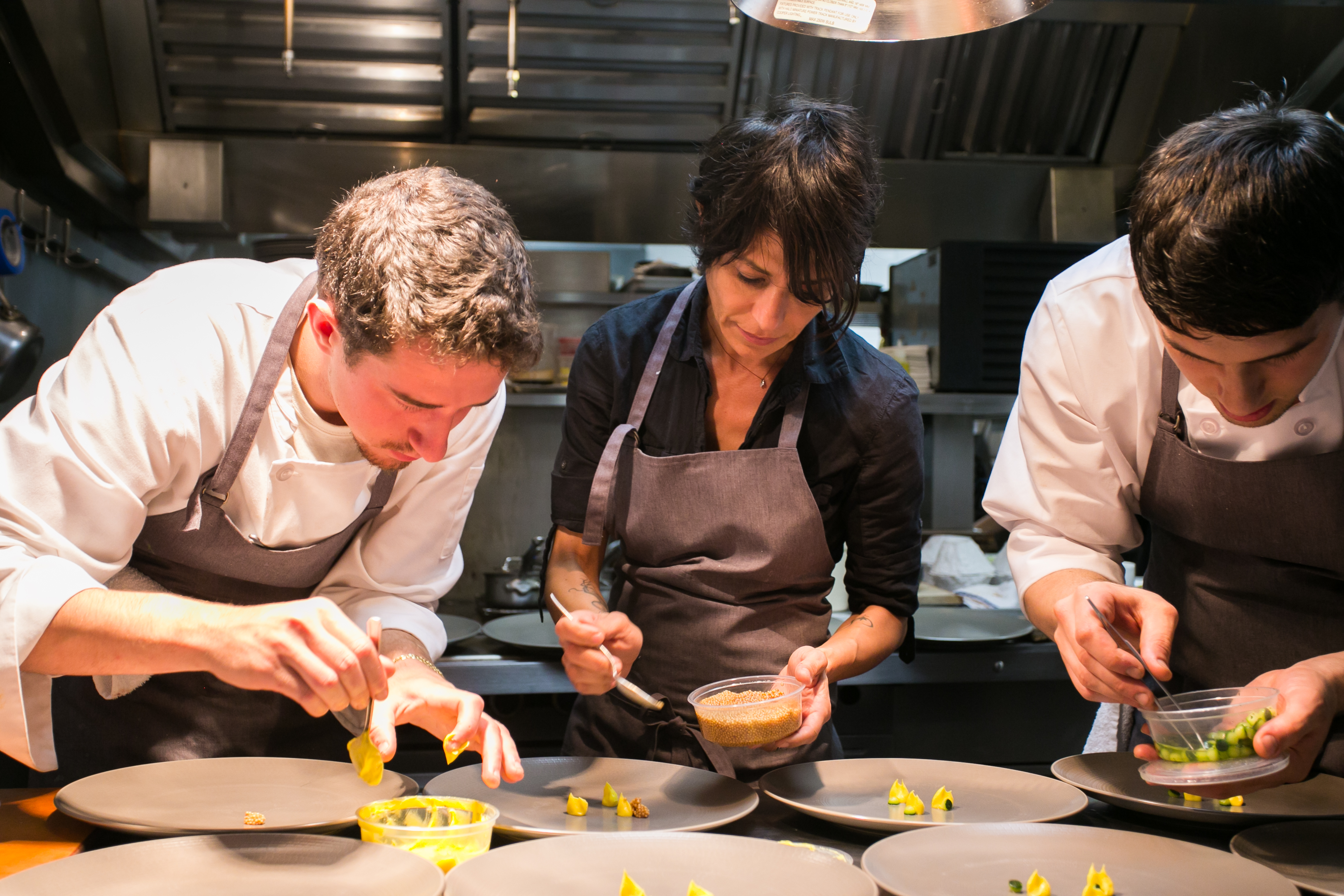
Crenn (center) in the kitchen

As of 2022, the tasting menu costs roughly $445.92 per person (includes tax and tip, but not drinks). The menu is written as a poem, each line is influenced by her father's teachings of art and expresses Dominique's childhood on a farm. The 12-course tasting menu has a heavy focus on fish.

== Accolades and awards ==
By 2013, the restaurant received two Michelin stars, making Dominique Crenn the first female chef to earn the distinction in the United States. In 2018, Atelier Crenn earned three Michelin stars for 2019 which again made her not only the first, but also the only female chef to do so in the United States. Crenn earned the award "best female chef in the world", a distinction she is dismissive of as she believes there is no reason for gender separation in culinary skills.

Atelier Crenn received a James Beard Award and joined "Michael Bauer's Four-Star Club".

== Reviews ==
The restaurant has been described as "wonderful balance of grace, artistry, technical ability and taste".

== See also ==
- Bar Crenn
- List of French restaurants
- List of Michelin 3-star restaurants
- List of Michelin 3-star restaurants in the United States
- List of Michelin-starred restaurants in California
