= Michel Bras =

French chef

- Born: 4 November 1946 (age 78); Gabriac, Aveyron, France
- Culinary career
- Rating(s): Michelin stars
- Current restaurant(s): Bras Michel et Sébastien (Laguiole)
- Website: www.bras.fr/en

Michel Bras (born 4 November 1946) is a French chef. His restaurant located in Laguiole in the Aveyron was rated three stars in the Guide Michelin since 1999. It is also classed in the "Relais & Châteaux" since 1992. He was classed several times among the 10 best restaurants in the world.

== Career ==
His cooking style is described as "creative" is often associated to fresh herbs and edible flowers. He has also created the recipe of a famous biscuit with chocolate coulant.

In June 2002, Michel opened with his son Sébastien a second restaurant at the Windsor Hotel of Hokkaido in Japan. The restaurant in Laguiole was named Bras Michel et Sébastien.

In 2008, Michel Bras and the Japanese brand KAI (specialized in knife confection and other blades) have been working together for a number of years. They have developed series of custom knives intended in majority to restaurant professionals.

In 2014, Michel Bras launched a brasserie inside the Soulages museum located in Rodez, and also in Toulouse a new original concept of fast-food named "Capucin", qualified as a "gastronomic and Aveyron version of the fast-food", which received several prizes, but closed in 2016.

In September 2017, Sébastien Bras announced with the agreement of his family, to voluntarily give up his Michelin rating and not appear in the guide anymore, in order to continue to create more serenely.

== Bibliography ==
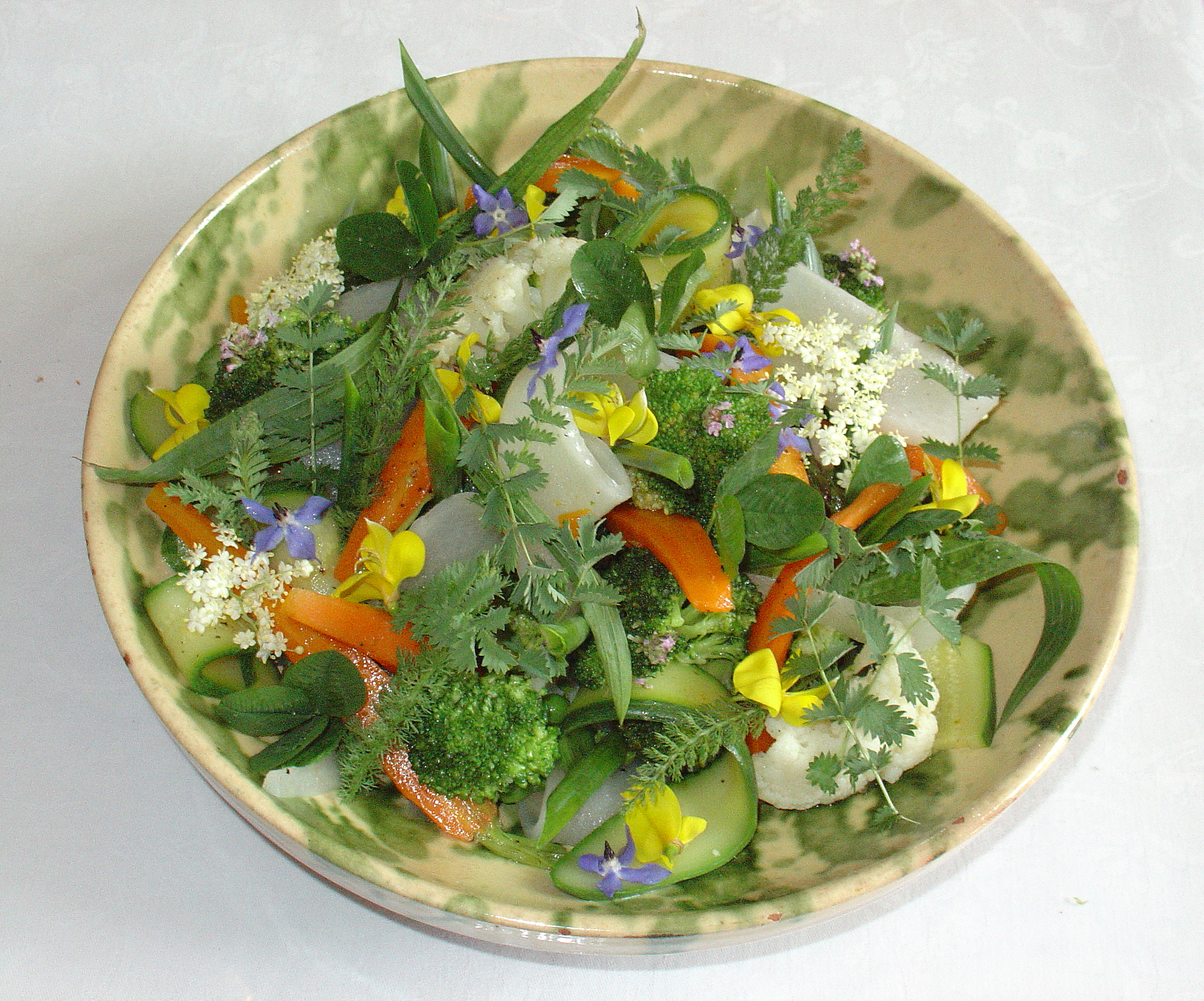
Gargouillou of vegetables

- Éditions du Rouergue, ed. (1991). Le Livre de Michel Bras (in French). Rouergue. ISBN 9782905209511.
- Éditions du Rouergue, ed. (1993). Les desserts (in French). Rodez. ISBN 2905209763.
- Éditions du Rouergue, ed. (2002). Bras : Laguiole, Aubrac, France (in French). Rodez. ISBN 2841563502.
- Éditions du Rouergue, ed. (2005). Petits festins et desserts (in French). Rodez. ISBN 2841566617.

== See also ==
- List of Michelin 3-star restaurants
