= Saison (restaurant) =

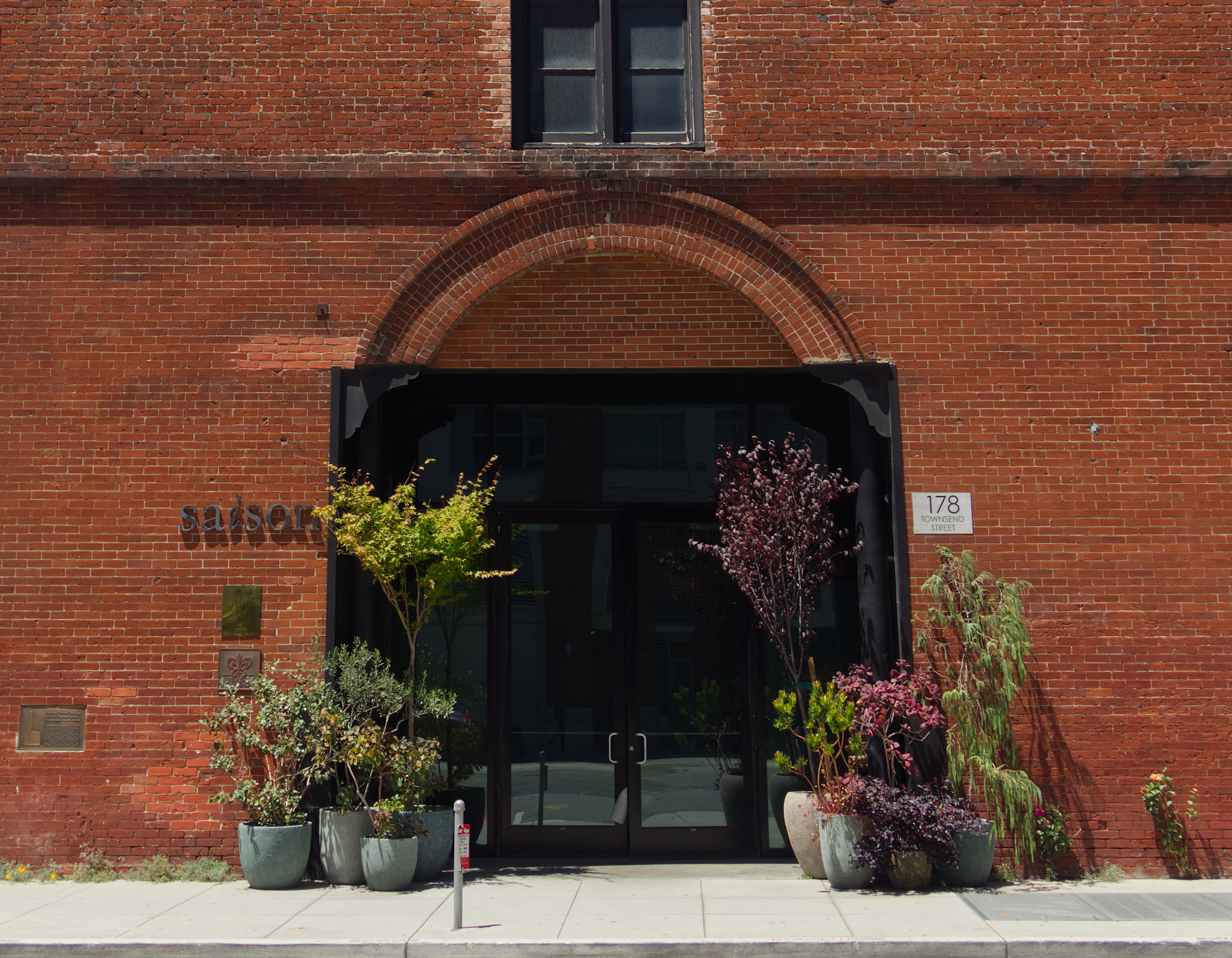
- Saison's exterior in July 2026
- Interactive map of Saison

Restaurant information
- Established: 2012; 14 years ago
- Owners: Mark Bright, Jag Kapour, Gary Gauba
- Head chef: Richard Lee
- Food type: New American
- Rating: (Michelin Guide), AAA Five Diamond Award (2014-2025)
- Location: 178 Townsend St, San Francisco, California, 94107, United States
- Coordinates: 37.77952°N 122.39225°W
- Website: saisonsf.com

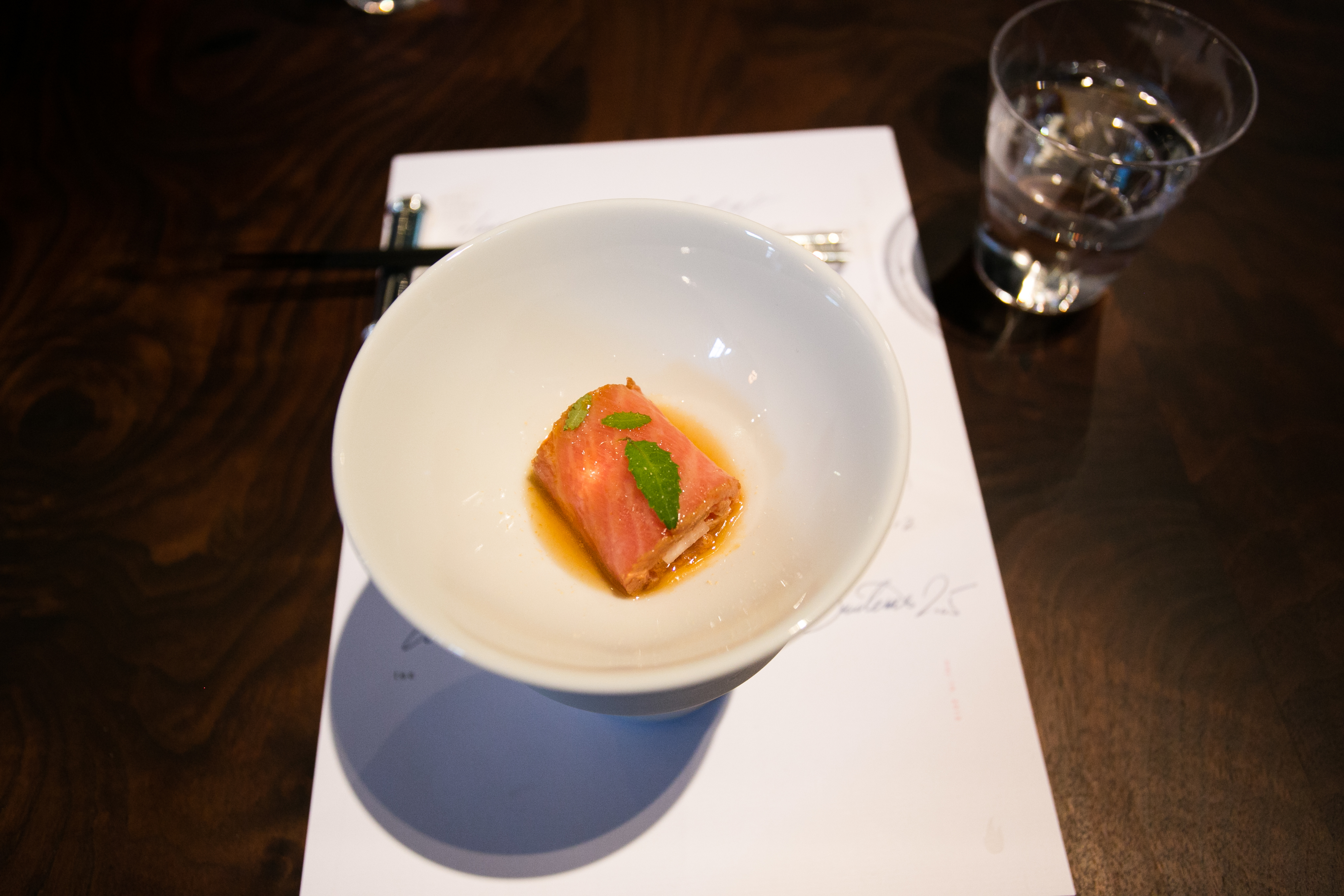
A dish served at the restaurant, 2013.

Saison is a San Francisco restaurant that earned the highest rating of three stars from the Michelin Guide in 2014. It is located in the SoMa district. The founder is Beverage Director and Winemaker for Saison Winery, Mark Bright. The Executive Chef is Richard Lee.

== Awards and honors ==
- 4 Stars, San Francisco Magazine
- 2014-2023 Grand Award, Wine Spectator
- 2016 ranked 27 in The World's 50 Best Restaurants
- 2017 ranked 37 among The World's 50 Best Restaurants
- 2025, retained 2 Michelin Stars

== See also ==
- List of Michelin-starred restaurants in California
