= List of restaurants in Chicago =

There are many notable restaurants in the American city of Chicago, Illinois.

== Current ==
The Berghoff

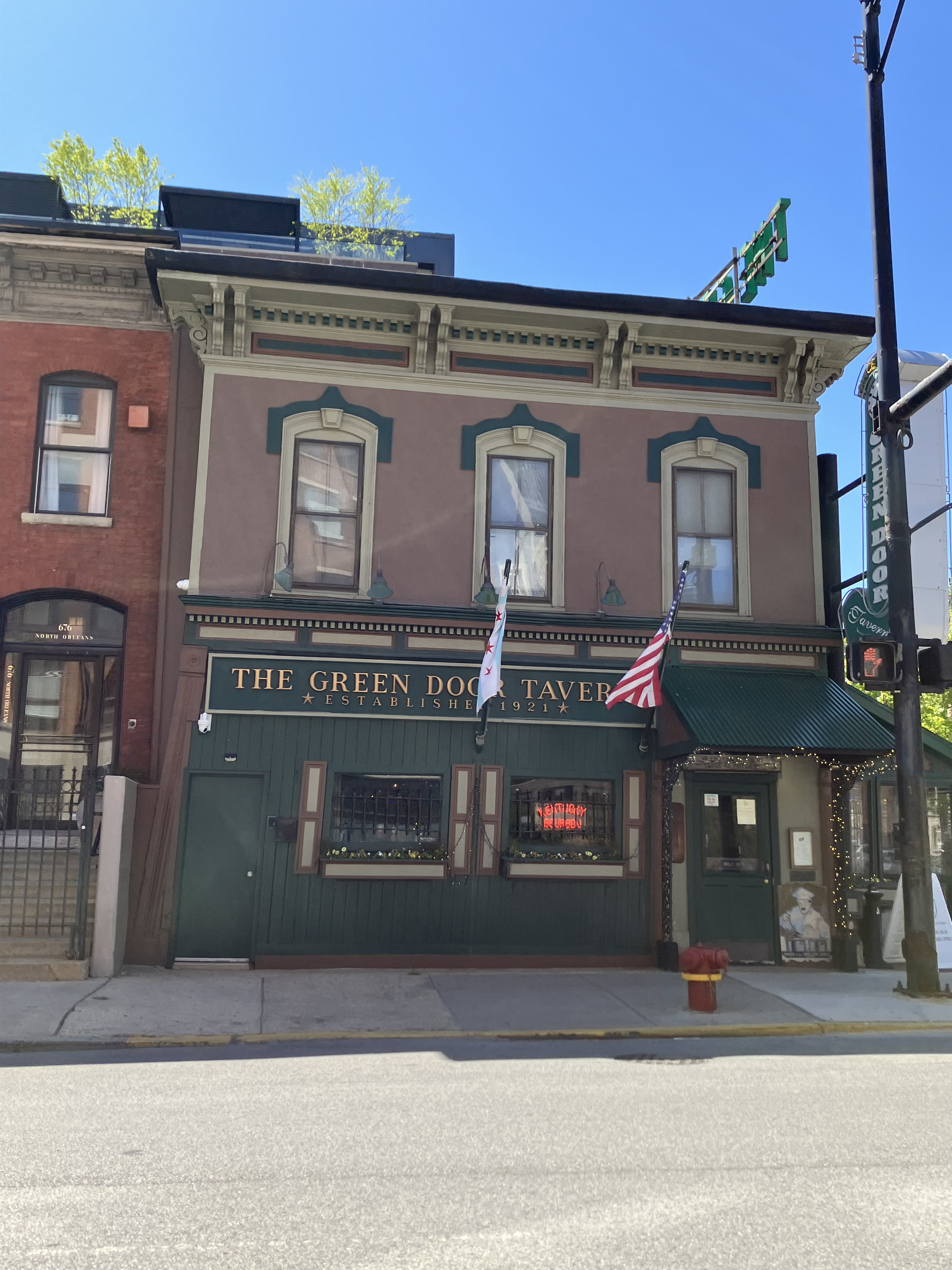
Green Door Tavern

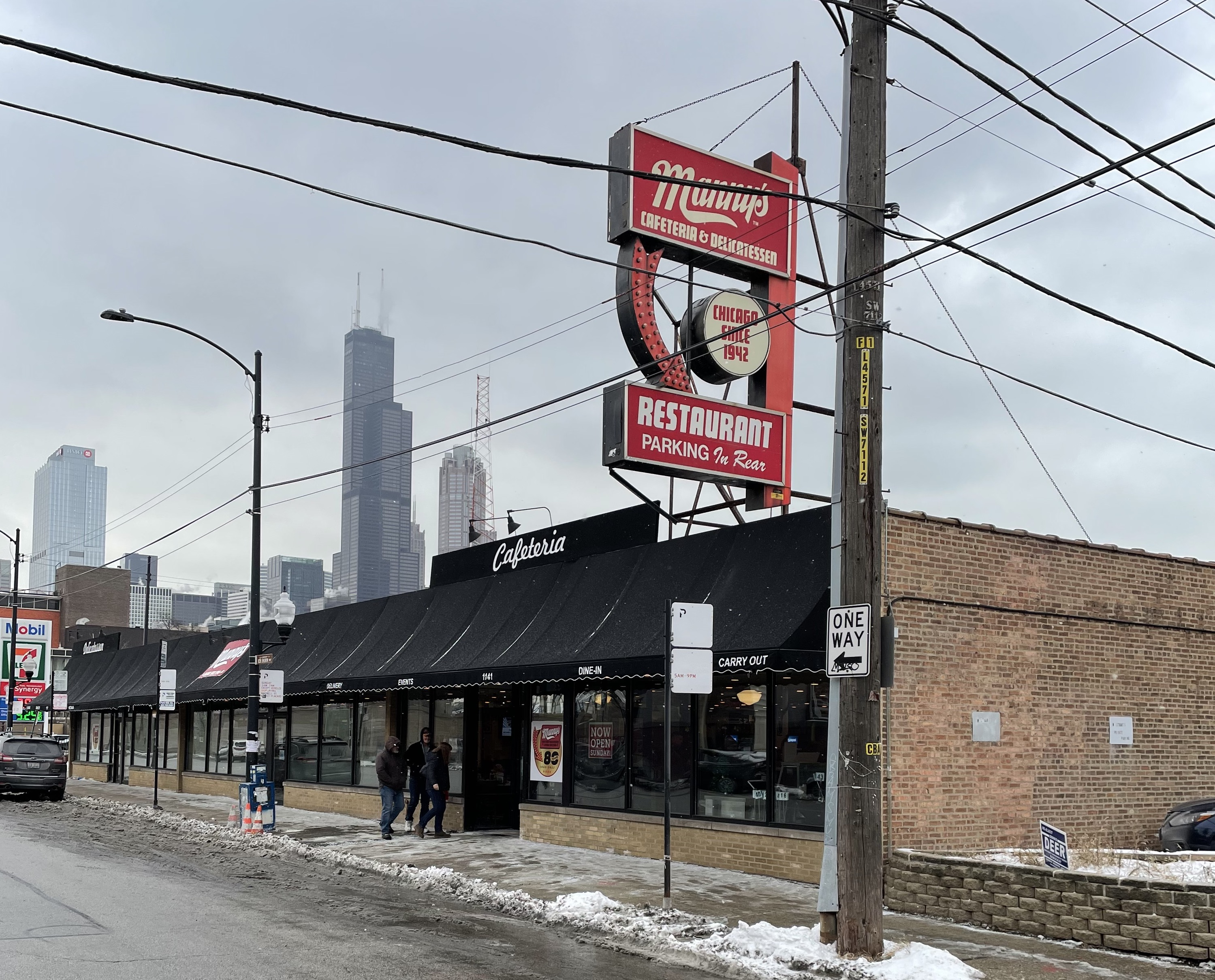
Manny's Deli

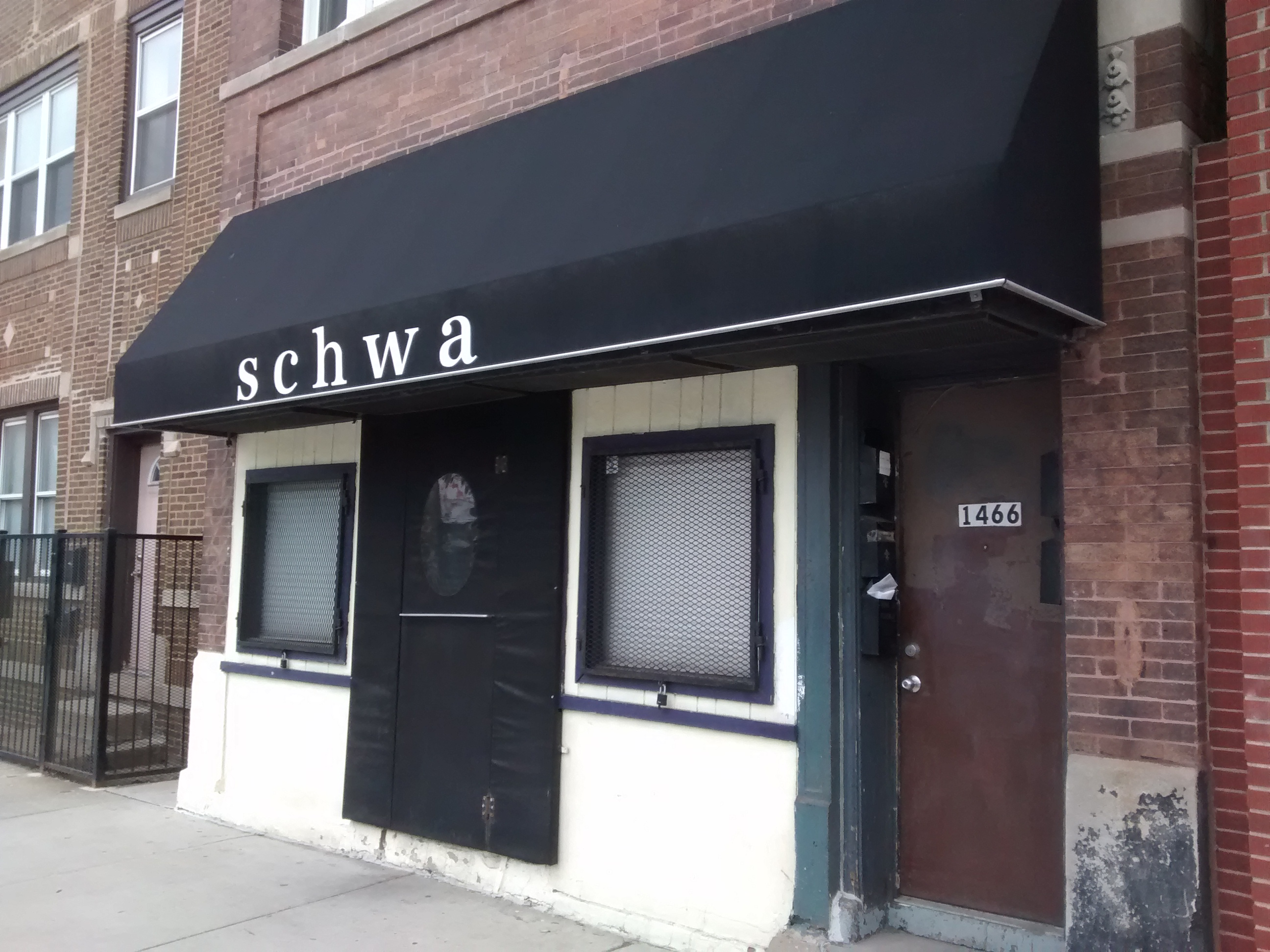
Schwa

- Akahoshi Ramen
- Alinea
- Ann Sather Restaurant
- Atelier
- Aurelio's Pizza
- Avec
- Bar Roma
- Beatrix
- The Berghoff
- Big Chicks
- Billy Goat Tavern
- Boka
- Brown's Chicken & Pasta
- Cafecito
- Calumet Fisheries
- Cariño
- Ceres Cafe
- Chicago Pizza and Oven Grinder Company
- The Cubby Bear
- EL Ideas
- Elske
- Epic Burger
- Esmé
- Ever
- Firehouse Restaurant
- Fluky's
- Frontera Grill
- Frontier
- Galit
- Gibsons Italia
- Gino's East
- Giordano's
- Girl & the Goat
- Goddess and the Baker
- Golden Nugget Pancake House
- Goose Island Brewery
- Greek Islands
- Green Door Tavern
- Harold's Chicken Shack
- Home Run Inn
- Indienne
- Irazu Costa Rica Restaurant
- Kasama
- Lem's Bar-B-Q
- Lettuce Entertain You Enterprises
- Longman & Eagle
- Lou Malnati's Pizzeria
- LYFE Kitchen
- Mako
- Manny's Deli
- Margie's Candies
- Maxwell Street Depot
- Michael Jordan's Steakhouse
- Mon Ami Gabi
- Moody Tongue
- Morton's The Steakhouse
- Mr. Beef
- Next
- NoMI
- North Pond
- Oriole
- Parachute
- Park Grill
- Portillo's Restaurants
- Porto
- Potbelly Sandwich Shop
- Pueblito Viejo
- Revolution Brewing
- Roeser's Bakery
- Roister
- Rosati's
- Schwa
- Sepia
- Sifr
- Smyth
- Superdawg
- Tamale Guy
- Topolobampo
- Tufano's Vernon Park Tap
- Uno Pizzeria & Grill
- Walker Bros.
- White Palace Grill
- The Wieners Circle

== Defunct ==
- 42 Grams
- Acadia
- Angels & Kings
- Blackhawk
- Brasserie Jo
- Claudia
- Chez Paul
- Demon Dogs
- Elizabeth
- Entente
- Everest
- Fat Rice
- Goosefoot
- Grace
- GreenRiver
- The Great Gritzbe's Flying Food Show
- Heartland Cafe
- Henry's Hamburgers
- Holly Tree Inn
- Hot Doug's
- Kikko
- L2O
- Les Nomades
- London House
- Meatheads Burgers & Fries
- Michael Jordan's Restaurant
- Moto
- The Pump Room
- RIA
- Rock N Roll McDonald's
- Schaller's Original Pump
- Sixteen
- Spiaggia
- Stir Crazy
- Temporis
- Tru
- Vie
- Yūgen
