= Knife Edge: Chasing Michelin Stars =

2025 documentary television series

- Genre: Documentary
- Presented by: Jesse Burgess
- Composers: Nick Foster (season 1); Sam Thompson (season 1); Raphaelle Thibaut (season 2)
- Country of origin: United Kingdom
- Original language: English
- No. of seasons: 2
- No. of episodes: 10

Production
- Executive producers: Gordon Ramsay; Lisa Edwards; Lorraine Charker-Phillips; Jill Greenwood; Morgan Roberts (season 1)
- Running time: 42–55 minutes
- Production companies: Studio Ramsay Global; Fox Entertainment

Original release
- Network: Apple TV
- Release: October 10, 2025 – present

Knife Edge: Chasing Michelin Stars is a television docuseries following chefs and restaurants vying for recognition by the Michelin Guide.

The series follows chefs in multiple locations who are trying to achieve recognition from Michelin. Some chefs are attempting to achieve their first Michelin star, and others are attempting to move from one star to two or from two stars to three. The series moves from the United States, Great Britain, Italy, Scandinavia, and Mexico as the Michelin season progresses. The show represents the first time the Michelin organization has cooperated with a filming crew.

The show is hosted by Jesse Burgess. The first season was filmed over a period of twelve months.

The docuseries was executive produced by Gordon Ramsay. It premiered on 10 October 2025 on Apple TV. In May 2026, Apple TV renewed the series for a second season, which premiered on 25 September 2026. In November 2026, Apple announced that the series had been renewed for a third season.

== Featured restaurants ==
Stars and ratings as depicted in Knife Edge: Chasing Michelin Stars. Some restaurants had earned or lost their stars after the premiere.

=== Brazil ===
Restaurants featured
| Name | Cuisine | Chef | Ceremony | Rating Held | Rating Earned |
|---|---|---|---|---|---|
| Evvai | Brazilian / Italian | Luiz Filipe Souza | 2026 | 2 Michelin stars | 3 Michelin stars |
| Madame Olympe | French | Jessica Trindade | 2026 | — | 1 Michelin star |
| Oseille | Modern | Thomas Troisgros | 2026 | 1 Michelin star | 1 Michelin star |

=== California ===
Restaurants featured
| Name | Cuisine | Chef | Ceremony | Rating Held | Rating Earned |
|---|---|---|---|---|---|
| Harbor House | Californian | Matthew Kammerer | 2024 | 2 Michelin stars | 2 Michelin stars |
| Pasta | Bar | American | DJ Nelson | 2024 | 1 Michelin star | 1 Michelin star |
| Pasjoli (Note: Pasjoli previously held a Michelin star for one year, in 2021) | French | Dave Beran | 2024 | Recommended | Recommended |

=== Chicago ===
Restaurants featured
| Name | Cuisine | Chef | Ceremony | Rating Held | Rating Earned |
|---|---|---|---|---|---|
| Cariño | Mexican | Norman Fenton | 2024 | — | 1 Michelin star |
| Esmé | Contemporary | Jenner Tomaska | 2024 | 1 Michelin star | 1 Michelin star |
| Feld (Note: Feld won a Michelin star the following year, in 2025) | Contemporary | Jake Potashnick | 2024 | — | Recommended |

=== Florida ===
Restaurants featured
| Name | Cuisine | Chef | Ceremony | Rating Held | Rating Earned |
|---|---|---|---|---|---|
| Calusso | Contemporary | Jonathan Kaiser | 2026 | — | — |
| Cotoa | Ecuadorian | Alejandra Espinoza | 2026 | Recommended | Bib Gourmand |
| Stubborn Seed | Contemporary | Jeremy Ford | 2026 | 1 Michelin star | 1 Michelin star |

=== France ===
Restaurants featured
| Name | Cuisine | Chef | Ceremony | Rating Held | Rating Earned |
|---|---|---|---|---|---|
| Erre | Creative | Clément Vergeat | 2026 | — | 1 Michelin star |
| Mallory Gabsi | French | Mallory Gabsi | 2026 | 1 Michelin star | 1 Michelin star |

=== Great Britain and Ireland ===
Restaurants featured
| Name | Cuisine | Chef | Ceremony | Rating Held | Rating Earned |
|---|---|---|---|---|---|
| Caractère | French | Emily Roux | 2025 | Recommended | 1 Michelin star |
| House | French | Tony Parkin (Note: Parkin departed as chef midway through filming of the show, but the restaurant retained its Michelin star rating under his successor whom was not featured) | 2025 | 1 Michelin star | 1 Michelin star |
| Wilsons | British | Jan Ostle | 2025 | — | 1 Michelin star |
| Vraic | Guernésiais | Nathan Davies | 2026 | — | 1 Michelin star |
| Ynyshir | Japanese | Gareth Ward | 2026 | 2 Michelin stars | 2 Michelin stars |

=== Italy ===
Restaurants featured
| Name | Cuisine | Chef | Ceremony | Rating Held | Rating Earned |
|---|---|---|---|---|---|
| Agriturismo Ferdy | Alpine | Alessio Manzoni | 2024 | — | 1 Michelin green star |
| Krèsios | Italian | Giuseppe Iannotti | 2024 | 2 Michelin stars | 2 Michelin stars |

=== Mexico ===
Restaurants featured
| Name | Cuisine | Chef | Ceremony | Rating Held | Rating Earned |
|---|---|---|---|---|---|
| Em | Mexican | Luis (Lucho) Martínez | 2024 | — | 1 Michelin star |
| Máximo (Note: Maximo won a Michelin star the following year, in 2025) | Mexican | Eduardo (Lalo) García | 2024 | — | Recommended |

=== New York ===
Restaurants featured
| Name | Cuisine | Chef | Ceremony | Rating Held | Rating Earned |
|---|---|---|---|---|---|
| Coqodaq | Korean | Seung Kyu (SK) Kim | 2024 | — | Bib Gourmand |
| The Musket Room (Note: Musket Room lost its star the following year, in 2025) | Contemporary | Mary Attea | 2024 | 1 Michelin star | 1 Michelin star |
| Nōksu | Korean | Dae Kim (Note: Kim departed as the restaurant's chef in 2025) | 2024 | — | 1 Michelin star |

=== Nordic ===
Restaurants featured
| Name | Cuisine | Chef | Ceremony | Rating Held | Rating Earned |
|---|---|---|---|---|---|
| Aure | Nordic | Nicky Arentsen | 2024 | — | 1 Michelin star |
| Jordnær | Creative | Eric Kragh Vildgaard | 2024 | 2 Michelin stars | 3 Michelin stars |
| Knystaforsen | Nordic | Nicolai Tram | 2024 | 1 Michelin star | 1 Michelin star |
| Adam/Albin | Nordic | Adam Dahlberg / Albin Wessman | 2026 | 1 Michelin star | 1 Michelin star |
| Ekstedt | Nordic | Niklas Ekstedt | 2026 | 1 Michelin star | 1 Michelin star |
