= Jason Pickleman =

American graphic designer (1965–2024)

Jason Pickleman (April 6, 1965 – May 12, 2024) was a graphic designer, artist, and art collector. From 1992 until 2023 he ran JNL Graphic Design, a Chicago-based studio he cofounded with his wife, Leslie Bodenstein.

== Early life and education ==
Jason Pickleman was born on April 6, 1965, the son of Jack and Brenda Pickleman. He grew up in Hinsdale, a western suburb of Chicago. He studied English literature at Boston University, graduating in 1987. At Boston University, he met Leslie Bodenstein. She would become his partner in JNL Graphic Design, the studio the pair founded in 1992.

== Work ==
After graduation, Pickleman moved to Chicago and worked for Michael Glass at Michael Glass Design as his studio assistant for four years. In 1992, he and his wife Leslie Bodenstein founded JNL Graphic Design, whose clients included the Millennium Park Foundation, SkinnyPop, Blackbird, the Chicago Transit Authority, The Field Museum, the Oneida Nation of Wisconsin, the University of Chicago, and the Prada Foundation. JNL additionally designed books for artists including Ai Weiwei, Moshekwa Langa, and Ralph Arnold and the first books by Kerry James Marshall and Kara Walker. Pickleman and his projects have been celebrated by institutions including the James Beard Foundation, the Museum of Contemporary Photography, the Chicago Design Archive, and the Society of Typographic Arts, and artists including Tony Tasset, The Aluminum Group, and Rick Valicenti. The studio was located on the second floor of a decommissioned US Post Office in River North, Chicago. The studio closed on May 31, 2023.

Pickleman started making art in the mid-80s, including text-based paintings, collages, and Polaroid photographs. His work exhibited in individual and group exhibitions such as "Young Chicago" at The Art Institute of Chicago, "Making Time for Joy" at The Suburban in Milwaukee, Wisconsin, "Light Reading" at Ken Saunders Gallery, and the Neon Light Museum. The Chicago Transit Authority (CTA), through their Arts in Transit program, commissioned MONT/ROSE Area (2007), a mural of 318 anodized aluminum letterforms celebrating the surrounding street names at the CTA Brown Line Montrose Station. In 2021, Pickleman created "Hand Heart," a monumental public sculpture for Sculpture Milwaukee, now permanently installed at Governor State University’s outdoor sculpture garden, theNate.

Pickleman additionally taught in several universities, including Merz Academy in Stuttgart, Germany (1999, 2003), The School of the Art Institute of Chicago (2000), Archeworks in Chicago (2002–2005), and the University of Illinois Chicago School of Architecture (2004–2005).

=== Lawrence & Clark ===
Jason Pickleman started actively collecting art in 1988. By his own account, he and his wife had a collection of more than 1,000 works, hundreds of which were displayed at their home and office. On July 12, 2015, Jason opened his collection gallery, Lawrence & Clark, named for the Chicago intersection where it stood (4755 N. Clark St). Here, Pickleman curated and installed works from his own collection and organized several exhibitions, including the annual mail art show and "SEX." He said,

“I want to allow the art to be public again. When it’s in a private collection, its power to influence is severely curtailed. But this will change the equation by letting the work be viewed and discussed, hopefully by viewers who have never seen it before.”

The gallery closed on June 6, 2020 during the first months of the COVID-19 pandemic, after a five-year run. In October 2020, Jason Pickleman published Lawrence and Clark, a book documenting the history of the gallery.

Wright, a modern and contemporary design auction house, presented “Every Day is Different: The Collection of Jason Pickleman,” on September 14, 2023.

== Awards and achievements ==
- On February 29, 2024, Pickleman was an honoree of the Museum of Contemporary Photography's DARKROOM annual benefit.
- His work for The Publican restaurant was twice nominated for a James Beard Award for Outstanding Graphic Design.
- His design of the Hidden issue of MAS Context was recognized as a winner in the 2017 STA 100 competition organized by the Society of Typographic Arts.
- He was included in the Design 50 Hall of Fame by Newcity, an honor based on the determination that they are "well-established and foundational to the design world of Chicago."
- The work of JNL is held in the collections of Columbia College in Chicago and The Art Institute of Chicago.
- In 2023, Pickleman was the Neon Dreams Benefit Honoree.
