= Moody Tongue =

Restaurant in Chicago, Illinois, U.S.

- Interactive map of Moody Tongue

Restaurant information
- Established: June 21, 2014
- Owner: Jared Rouben
- Head chef: James Bingham (Kitchen); Jared Rouben (Brewery)
- Pastry chef: Shannon Morrison
- Rating: (Michelin Guide)
- Location: 2515 S. Wabash Ave., Chicago, Illinois, 60616, United States
- Coordinates: 41°50′49″N 87°37′30″W
- Website: www.moodytongue.com

Moody Tongue is a restaurant and brewery in Chicago, Illinois. The restaurant serves American / New American cuisine and has received two Michelin stars.

Moody Tongue initially opened in 2014, solely as a brewery at a location in the Chicago neighborhood of Pilsen. In 2019, it moved to a larger space in the South Loop neighborhood, opening a dining room with a tasting menu concept with the goal of bringing "the culinary arts and the brewing community" together.

Unlike many Michelin-starred restaurants which offer a wine or cocktail pairing, Moody Tongue is notable for offering to pair its food with the beer produced from its own brewery, which range from pilsners, stouts, ipas and sours, among other beer types.

The kitchen is headed by Jared Wentworth, who had previously led former Chicago Michelin-starred restaurants Longman & Eagle and Dusek's Board & Beer, while beer production is overseen by the restaurant's owner, Jared Rouben.

The restaurant has a sister-location in New York, which serves sushi and Japanese cuisine.

== Notable dishes ==
One of the restaurant's signature dishes is its 12 Layer German Chocolate Cake, which includes layers of dark chocolate, German chocolate, espresso cheesecake, and chocolate buttercream. The cake was created by the brewery's pastry chef, Shannon Morrison.

The brewery also produces a Shaved Black Truffle pilsner, which is sometimes also offered on draught at the restaurant and served in champagne flutes. The beer is produced using Australian black truffles, and was originally created for use in Thomas Keller's Michelin-starred New York restaurant Per Se.

== Recognition ==
In 2020, the restaurant became the first brewery in the world to be awarded with two stars by the Michelin Guide, and the second overall with a star after fellow Chicago brewery Band of Bohemia.

The restaurant was downgraded to one star by the Michelin Guide in its 2024 update.

== See also ==
- List of Michelin-starred restaurants in Chicago
- List of New American restaurants
