= Omakase Yume =

Restaurant in Chicago, Illinois, U.S.

- Interactive map of Omakase Yume

Restaurant information
- Head chef: Sangtae Park
- Food type: Japanese
- Location: 651 W. Washington Blvd., Chicago, Illinois, 60661, United States
- Coordinates: 41°52′59″N 87°38′40″W
- Website: www.omakaseyume.com

Omakase Yume is a Japanese restaurant in Chicago, Illinois. It opened in Chicago's West Loop in July 2018 under chef Sangtae Park, initially as an eight-seat sushi counter. It received its first Michelin star in the 2020 Chicago guide, but lost it in the 2024 selection. Thrillist has included Omakase Yume in lists of Chicago's best sushi establishments.

== See also ==
- List of Japanese restaurants
- List of Michelin-starred restaurants in Chicago
