= Goosefoot (restaurant) =

Restaurant in Chicago, Illinois, U.S.

Coordinates: 41.9687°N 87.6959°W

goosefoot
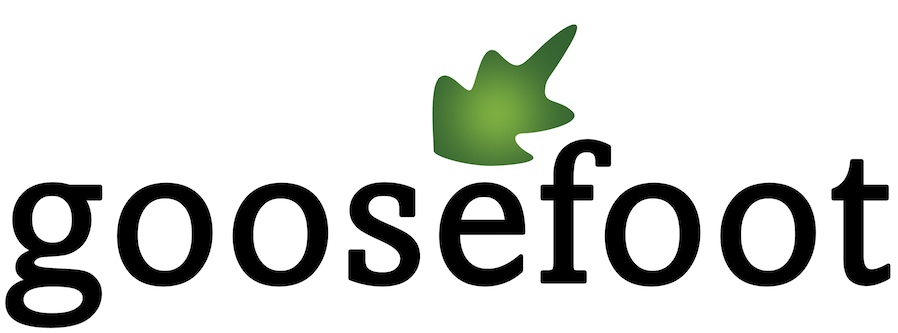
- Interactive map of goosefoot

Restaurant information
- Established: 2011
- Owners: Chris and Nina Nugent
- Chef: Chris Nugent
- Food type: French cuisine
- Dress code: Business Casual
- Location: Chicago, Cook, Illinois, 60625, USA
- Seating capacity: 60
- Website: www.goosefoot.net

Goosefoot (stylized as goosefoot) is an American restaurant serving French cuisine located in Chicago. An adjacent grocery, called goosefoot food & wine, opened in 2014. The food and wine store added an ice cream shop in late 2017. In 2012, shortly after the restaurant opened, a reviewer for Chicago magazine wrote "Goosefoot’s air flows with the particular bliss that permeates any young restaurant when diners realize they’re in a special place, and the smile on every face says the same thing: This is my first visit of many."

Located near Lincoln Square in Chicago's Far North Side, Goosefoot is a fine dining establishment offering multi- course prix fixe dinners. It is owned and operated by the husband and wife team of Chris and Nina Nugent. Chris Nugent was previously chef for seven years at fine dining restaurant Les Nomades.

Although the exterior is described as "nondescript", the interior has been called a "warm, colorful, and elegant boîte". The leisurely dining experience lasts about 3-1/2 hours. Wine can be ordered in advance from the adjacent grocery store/wine shop operated by the Nugents. Dishes served at one meal included scallops, chestnut soup with mushrooms, tortellini with truffles, Angus beef with crisp pea tendrils, and a frozen dessert made of vanilla, pink peppercorn, cherry, matcha tea and truffle. The final course was a coffee beverage incorporating fennel, Elderflower and Meyer lemon, served with a macaron. According to the Michelin Guide, the restaurant is "truly unique", and "the multicourse menu showcases classical technique and contemporary artistry."

The restaurant encourages customers to bring their own wine. In 2013, OpenTable gave Goosefoot its "Top 100 Best Restaurants for Service in the United States" award, out of more than 15,000 restaurants evaluated.

In February 2024, the owners announced Goosefoot would close and they plan to relocate.

It relocated in 2026 to 4520 North Lincoln Avenue in the Lincoln Square neighborhood of Chicago, discontinued its BYOB policy, and introduced a wine list.

== See also ==
- List of Michelin-starred restaurants in Chicago
