= Senza (restaurant) =

Defunct restaurant in Chicago, Illinois, U.S.

- Interactive map of Senza

Restaurant information
- Established: August 2012
- Closed: January 17, 2015
- Chef: Noah Sandoval
- Location: 2873 N. Broadway, Chicago, Illinois, 60657, United States
- Coordinates: 41°56′6″N 87°38′38.5″W

Senza was a restaurant in Chicago, Illinois.

== History ==
Senza opened in August 2012 as a gluten-free restaurant. Under executive chef Noah Sandoval, it developed a fine-dining tasting-menu and à la carte format. It received its first Michelin star in November 2013 and retained the star for the 2015 guide.

Senza's final service was January 17, 2015. Wheat's End Artisan Foods and Cafe was scheduled to take over its Broadway space.

== See also ==
- List of defunct restaurants of the United States
- List of Michelin-starred restaurants in Chicago
