= Claudia (restaurant) =

Restaurant in Chicago, Illinois, U.S.

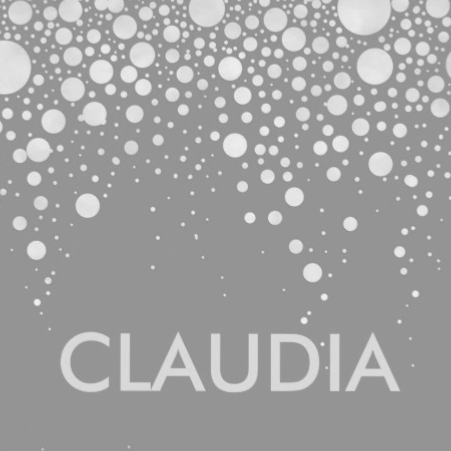
- Interactive map of Claudia

Restaurant information
- Established: 2021
- Closed: 2023
- Head chef: Trevor Teich
- Food type: French and Japanese-inspired cuisine
- Location: 1952 North Damen Avenue, Chicago, Illinois, 60647, United States
- Coordinates: 41°55′3″N 87°40′40″W
- Website: claudiarestaurant.com

Claudia was a fine dining restaurant in the Bucktown neighborhood of Chicago, Illinois, United States, led by chef Trevor Teich. The restaurant received a Michelin star in March 2022, and closed in June 2023.

The restaurant offered tasting menus of up to 15 courses.

== History ==
Teich began Claudia as a pop-up in 2015; its first run lasted until 2018. He revived it in 2019, before the permanent Bucktown restaurant debuted in fall 2021. The restaurant was named for Teich's mother.

== Reception ==
In 2016, Chicago magazine named Claudia its best pop-up dinner. In 2020, the magazine ranked Claudia eighth on its list of the year's best new restaurants.

== See also ==
- List of defunct restaurants of the United States
- List of Michelin-starred restaurants in Chicago
