= Courtright's (restaurant) =

Defunct restaurant in Willow Springs, Illinois, U.S.

- Interactive map of Courtright's

Restaurant information
- Established: March 1995
- Closed: December 31, 2013
- Previous owners: Rebecca Courtright and William Courtright
- Head chef: Jerome Bacle
- Location: 8989 Archer Avenue, Willow Springs, Cook, Illinois, 60480, United States
- Coordinates: 41°43′36″N 87°52′55″W
- Other locations: Three
- Website: www.courtrights.com

Courtright's was a Michelin-starred restaurant in Willow Springs, Illinois, United States.

== History ==
Courtright's opened in 1995 and was owned by Rebecca Courtright and her husband William. Jerome Bacle was its chef when it received one Michelin star in the 2012 guide. The restaurant closed after its New Year's Eve 2013 service.

== Reception ==
Courtright's lost its Michelin star the following year.

== See also ==
- List of defunct restaurants of the United States
- List of Michelin-starred restaurants in Chicago
