= Smyth (restaurant) =

Restaurant in Chicago, Illinois, U.S.

- Interactive map of Smyth

Restaurant information
- Established: 2016
- Head chef: John Shields
- Pastry chef: Karen Urie Shields
- Food type: Contemporary
- Rating: (Michelin Guide)
- Location: 177 North Ada Street, Chicago, Illinois, 60607, United States
- Coordinates: 41°53′7.0″N 87°39′38.1″W

Smyth is a restaurant located in Chicago, currently the only one holding three Michelin stars, having held 3 since 2023. Smyth is located on the second floor above a bar called The Loyalist also operated by Smyth's owners. In 2026, they were voted the #1 best restaurant in North America by The World's 50 Best Restaurants. The restaurant is run by couple John and Karen Urie Shields, and the name of the restaurant is an homage to Smyth County, Virginia, the location of their previous restaurant.

== Reviews ==
The Michelin Guide stated in its review: "A quail egg, gently smoked and topped with caviar, is given a twist with barley caramel. Resting inside its shell, plump Maine uni, amplified with a divine peach gel and wasabi cream, is both stunning and memorable. The chef's creativity is on full display in an utterly unique Dungeness crab dish, while wagyu sided by a truffle-flavored doughnut with marrow glaze is yet another hit. Savory sweets, like new potato ice cream, a corn macaron with peppery nasturtium, or the dark chocolate tartlet studded with kombu, raise the bar." Chicago magazine noted: "Every dish at Smyth flaunts deep, unforgettable flavors—some discombobulating, others harmonious. All spark genuine exhilaration, like a Halloween haunted house where the knowledge that you’re in no real danger doesn’t lessen the thrill one iota." A reviewer for Condé Nast Traveller noted that Smyth offers a "more-casual-than-normal seasonal tasting menu".

== See also ==
- List of Michelin 3-star restaurants in the United States
- List of Michelin-starred restaurants in Chicago
