= Yūgen (restaurant) =

Defunct Japanese restaurant in Chicago, Illinois

Restaurant information
- Established: November 2018
- Closed: May 29, 2021
- Location: 652 W. Randolph Street, Chicago, Illinois, 60661, United States

Yūgen was a contemporary Japanese tasting-menu restaurant in Chicago's West Loop. It opened in November 2018 at 652 West Randolph Street, in the former space of Grace, with Mari Katsumura as executive chef. The restaurant held one Michelin Star in the 2020 and 2021 Chicago guides before closing after service on May 29, 2021.

== See also ==
- List of Michelin-starred restaurants in Chicago
