= Seasons (restaurant) =

Defunct restaurant in Chicago, Illinois, U.S.

Restaurant information
- Established: 1989
- Closed: 2011
- Head chef: Kevin Hickey
- Location: 120 East Delaware Place, Chicago, Illinois, United States

Seasons was a restaurant in the Four Seasons Hotel Chicago in Chicago, Illinois. It operated from 1989 to 2011 and held one Michelin star in the 2011 and 2012 editions of the Michelin Guide Chicago.

== History ==
The restaurant was part of the Four Seasons Hotel Chicago, which opened in 1989. In 2002, Phil Vettel reported that executive chef Mark Baker was leaving Seasons at the end of June, after 23 years working at Four Seasons properties in Vancouver, Washington, D.C., Boston and Chicago.

Seasons received one star in the inaugural 2011 Michelin Guide Chicago. It retained the star for the 2012 guide. Kevin Hickey was executive chef during the restaurant's final period.

In November 2011, the hotel announced that Seasons would close after its New Year's Eve service. The restaurant's dining room was to become a junior ballroom and private-event space; a more casual successor restaurant was planned for part of the former space. Chicago reported that Hickey would remain with the hotel to oversee the then-unnamed successor's menu. The successor, Allium, opened in February 2012.
