= Boka (restaurant) =

Restaurant in Chicago

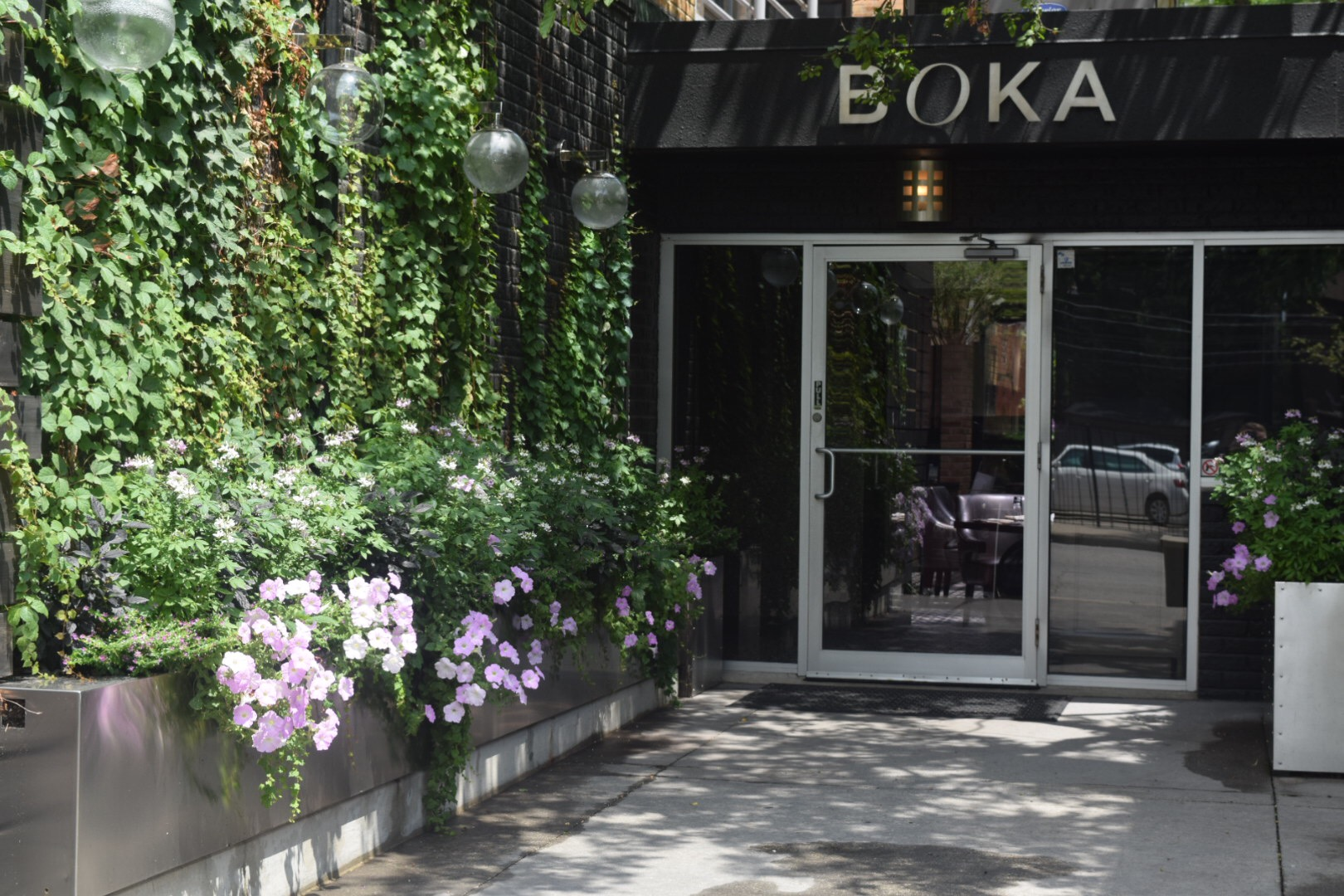
- Boka - Exterior
- Interactive map of Boka

Restaurant information
- Established: October 2003
- Chef: Lee Wolen
- Food type: New American
- Rating: (Michelin Guide)
- Location: Chicago, Illinois, 60614, United States
- Coordinates: 41.9136°N 87.6482°W
- Website: www.bokachicago.com

Boka is a Chicago restaurant which has retained a one-star ranking from the Michelin Guide since 2010. Its name is a portmanteau of the surnames of its founders, Kevin Boehm and Rob Katz. Boka received 3 stars from the Chicago Tribune and Chicago Magazine. The executive chef is Lee Wolen. Boka won Chef of the Year for Lee Wolen in 2015 in the Chicago Tribune, and Restaurant of the Year at the Jean Banchet Awards. Wolen was also awarded the best Chef in America award from Highlights magazine.

== See also ==
- List of Michelin-starred restaurants in Chicago
- List of New American restaurants
