= Acadia (restaurant) =

Defunct restaurant in Chicago, Illinois, U.S.

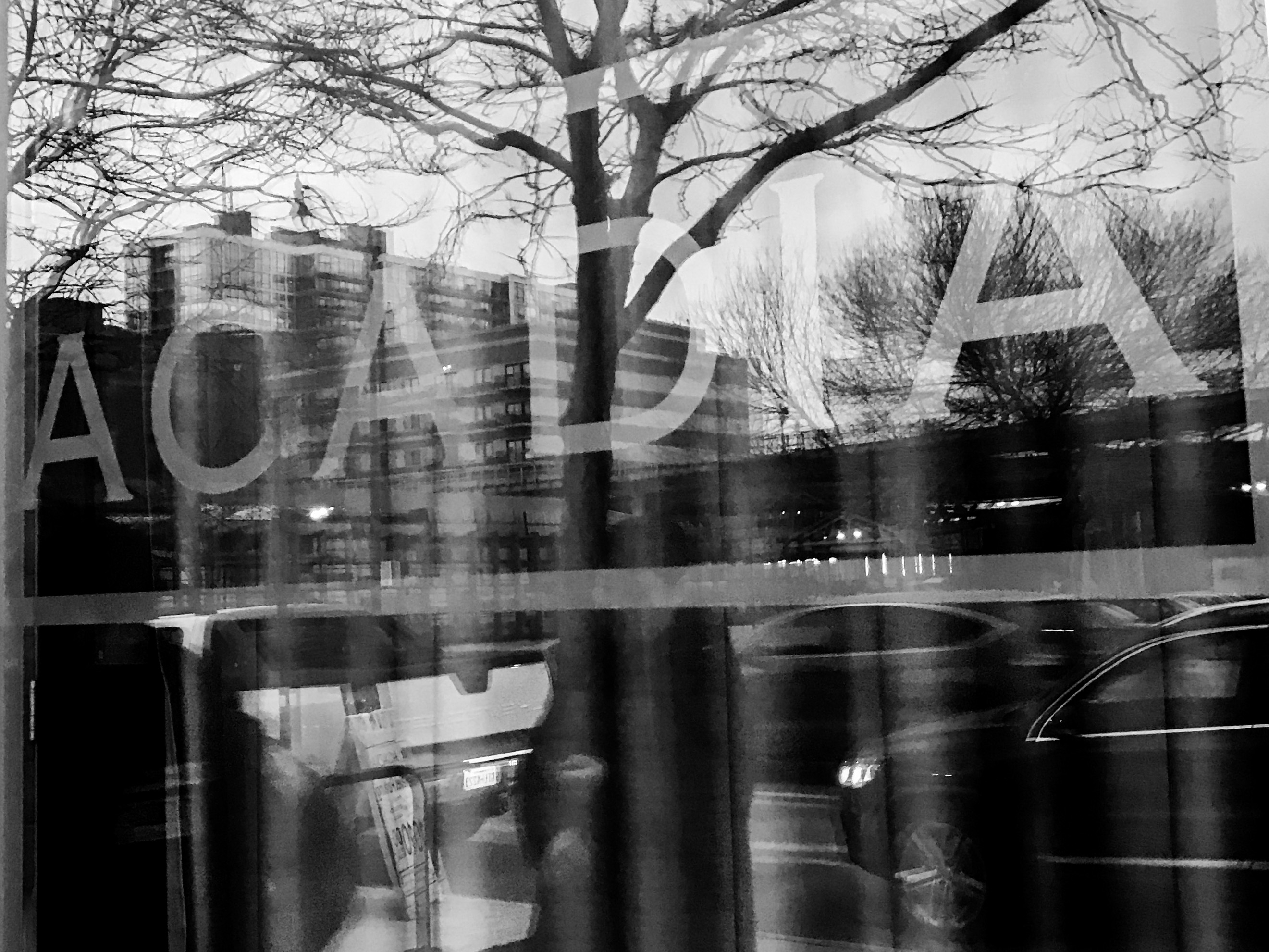
- Window of Acadia
- Interactive map of Acadia

Restaurant information
- Established: 2011
- Closed: 2020
- Head chef: Ryan McCaskey
- Food type: New American cuisine
- Rating: 2 Michelin stars
- Location: 1639 S. Wabash Ave., Chicago, Illinois, 60616, United States
- Coordinates: 41°51′32.5″N 87°37′31″W

Acadia was a restaurant in the South Side neighborhood of Chicago, Illinois, United States. It was opened by Ryan McCaskey in 2011. The restaurant served New American cuisine inspired by Maine's culinary history. It received Michelin stars several years in a row until its closure in 2020.

== Description ==
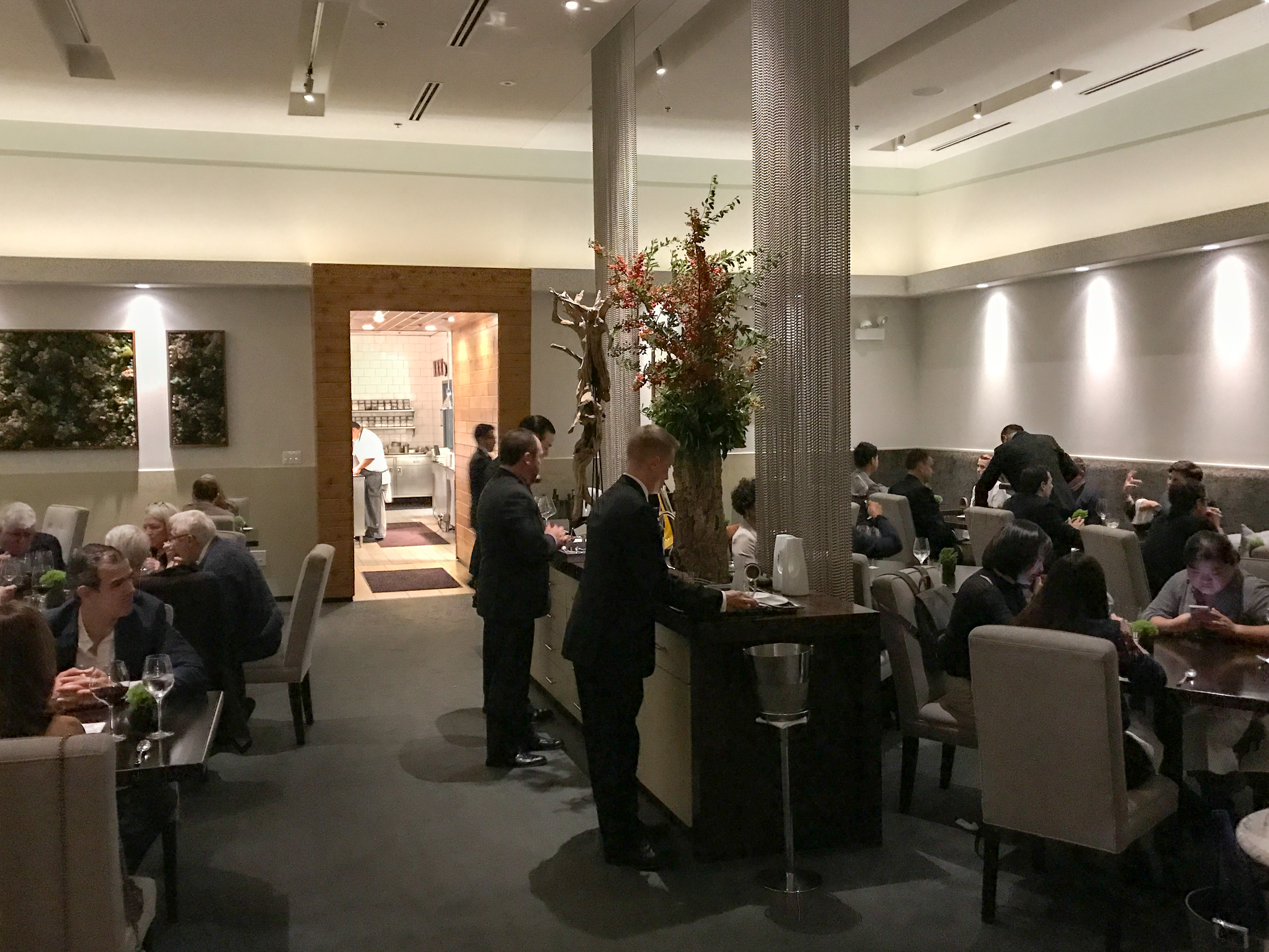
Acadia's dining room

Acadia was a fine dining restaurant that also had a bar where patrons could buy food, which was a more casual dining experience. The restaurant's bartender, Michael Simon, was noted by food critics for the experimental cocktails he created at Acadia. The exterior of the building was non-descript, while the interior was well-decorated. Phil Vettel of the Chicago Tribune described its dining room as "a warmly minimalist, softly lit and serenely quiet space with alabaster walls, neutral carpeting and beaded-metal curtains." It closed temporarily in 2015 for redecorating.

=== Menu ===
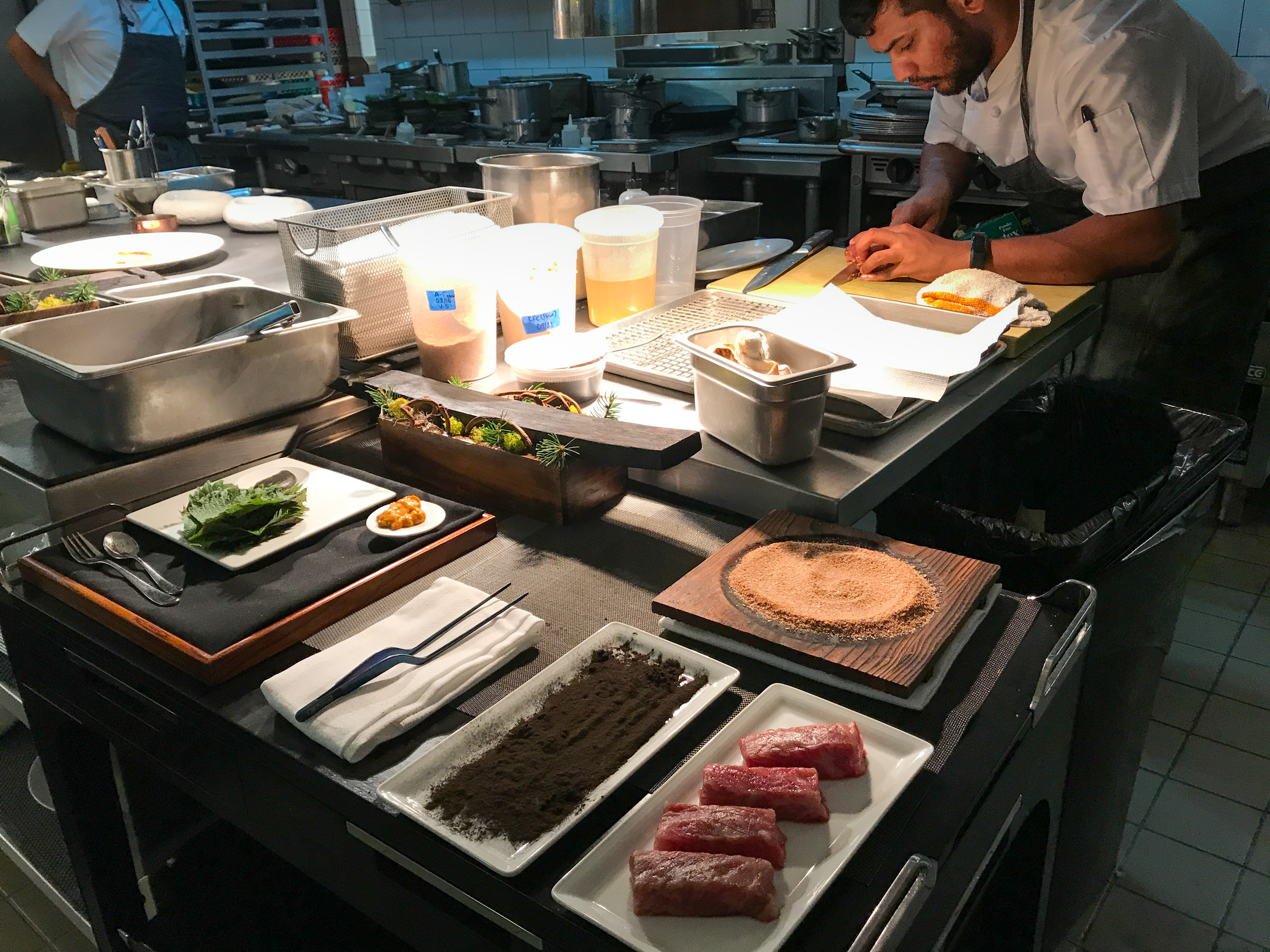
The wagyu course being prepared at Acadia

The restaurant served five- and ten-course tasting menus, as well as "upscale" contemporary American cuisine such as cheeseburgers, lobster rolls, lobster pot pie and a Wagyu steak dinner. The dishes on its menu were often heavy and rich. Writing for Time Out, Julia Kramer noted the relative affordability of its prices compared to similar restaurants. Its menu was heavily influenced by the cuisine of New England, particularly Maine. Jeff Ruby, of the magazine Chicago, observed that many dishes on the ten course menu had "a green-and-white palette meant to evoke McCaskey's briny Maine summers as a kid." Many of the restaurant's ingredients were sourced from Deer Isle, Maine.

== History ==
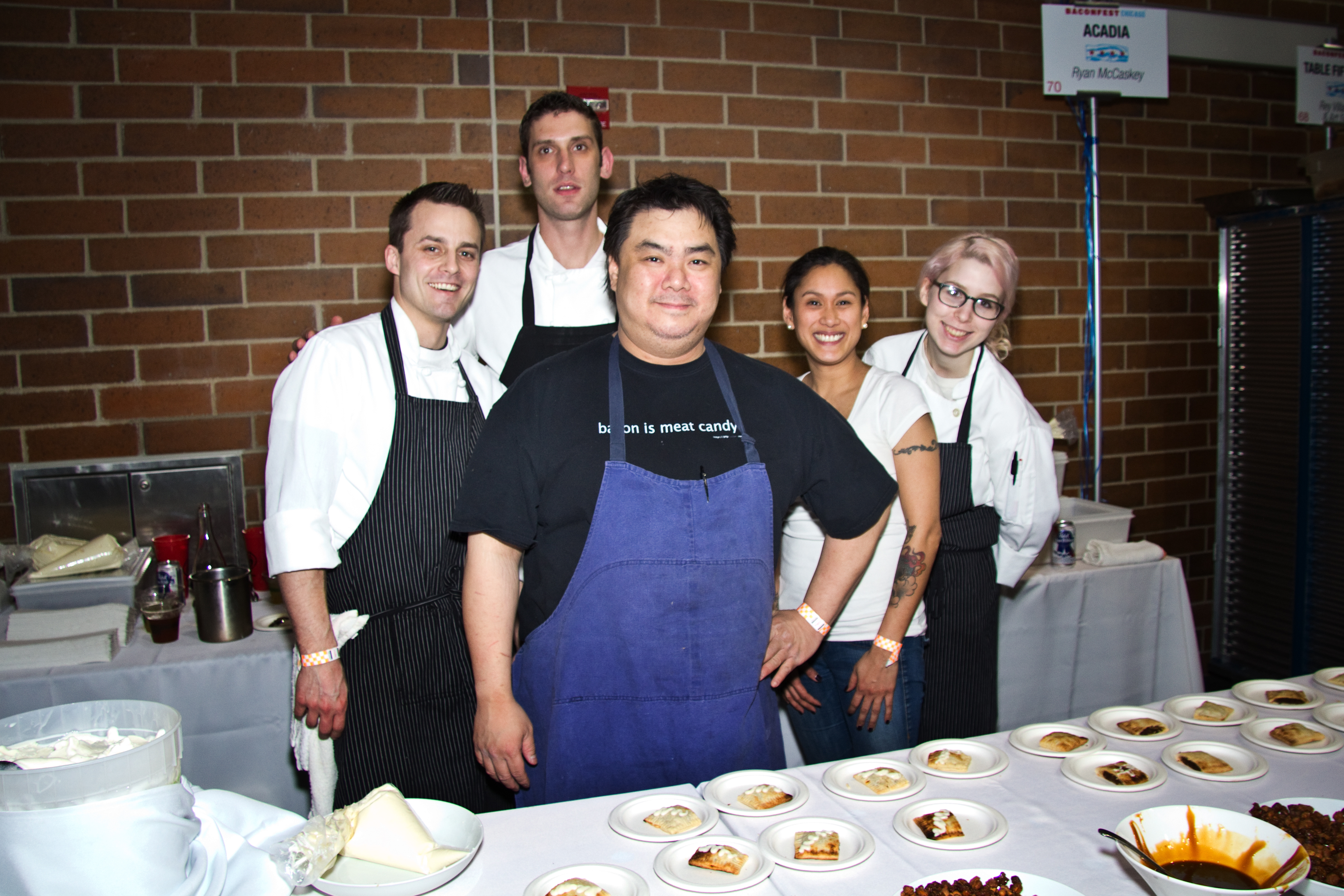
Ryan McCaskey with the staff of Acadia

Acadia opened in 2011, and was founded by Ryan McCaskey, a Vietnam-born chef who had been adopted by a Chicago couple as part of Operation Babylift. He learned to cook at an early age and spent summers in Maine as a child. McCaskey was executive chef and sole owner of the restaurant. It was noted to be one of only a few fine dining restaurants in South Side, Chicago, which was a more inexpensive neighborhood.

The restaurant was well received by food critics, and earned its first Michelin star in 2013. It went on to earn two Michelin stars, five years in a row. Chicago Tribune named it one of the best restaurants in Chicago in 2019.

It closed in 2020 because of the impact of COVID-19 pandemic on the restaurant industry. During the temporary closure, several former employees came forward with allegations that McCaskey fostered a toxic work environment in which sexual harassment occurred. The restaurant closed shortly afterwards and McCaskey opened a new restaurant, Acadia House Provisions, in Maine.

== See also ==
- List of defunct restaurants of the United States
- List of Michelin-starred restaurants in Chicago
- List of New American restaurants
