= RIA (restaurant) =

Coordinates: 41°53′59″N 87°37′39″W

- Interactive map of RIA

Restaurant information
- Established: 2009
- Closed: July 27, 2012; 13 years ago
- Head chef: Danny Grant
- Pastry chef: Aya Fukai
- Food type: French
- Rating: Michelin Guide
- Location: 11 East Walton, Chicago, Illinois, United States

RIA was an American restaurant in Chicago, Illinois. Located in the Waldorf Astoria Chicago, it originally opened in 2009, serving upscale French cuisine. RIA was popular with critics, earning many awards, including two Michelin stars. After losing executive chef Jason McLeod in 2011, RIA closed on July 27, 2012, after replacement Danny Grant left his restaurant position.

== History ==
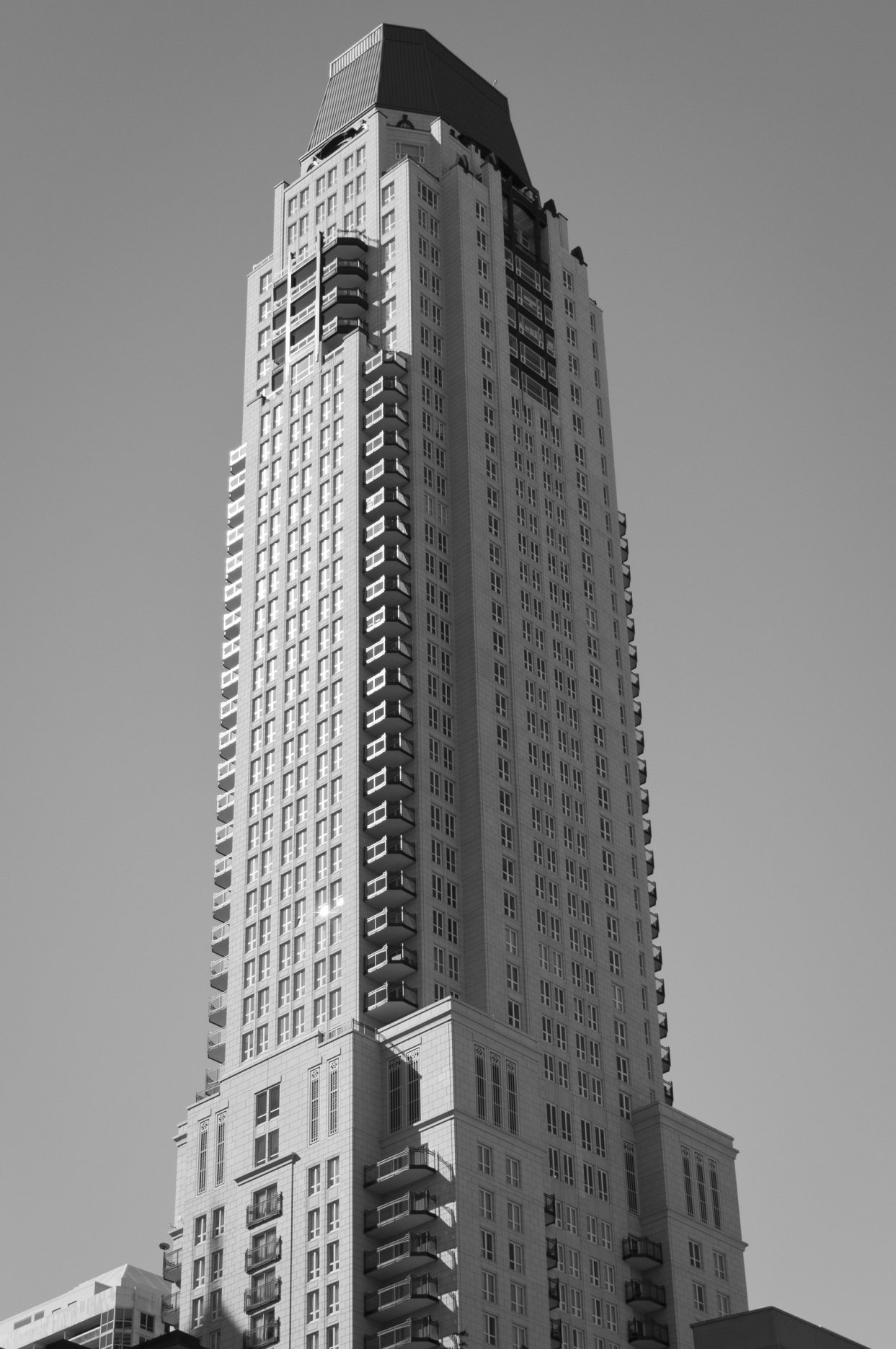
RIA was located in the Elysian Hotel, now called the Waldorf Astoria Chicago.

RIA was a part of the Elysian Hotel (now the Waldorf Astoria Chicago). The Elysian, developed by David Pisor, was originally conceptualized as a condo hotel before being run as a traditional hotel. RIA was one of two restaurants operated by the Elysian, with the other being European bistro Balsan. RIA and Balsan were both launched in April 2009, with Jason McLeod being the first executive chef for both restaurants. McLeod, originally from Vancouver, had previously worked at the Four Seasons in Whistler and Toronto. While working in San Diego, he was persuaded to come work for the Elysian after initially declining the invitation. Stephanie Prida joined the Elysian in June 2010 as the executive pastry chef for the two restaurants.

After closing temporarily from January 1 to 25, 2011, so that the staff could do research in New York, RIA reopened with a new menu. However, on February 11, 2011, it was announced that McLeod would be leaving the restaurant, with chef de cuisine Danny Grant taking his place. McLeod later stated that the parting of ways was amicable. He explained that his decision to leave was fueled by his desire to open his restaurant and that he gave notice of his departure during RIA's closure in January. In July of that year, Prida also left for an open position at the restaurant L20. She was replaced by pastry chef Aya Fukai.

On July 6, 2012, Grant confirmed that he would be leaving RIA on July 27, with management deciding to close RIA on Grant's last day to perform "a repositioning of its food and beverage options."

== Description ==
RIA was described by press release as a "globally influenced upscale restaurant". Listed by The Chicago Tribune Guide to Chicago as featuring "seasonally driven French fare", the restaurant was located on the third floor of the Elysian Hotel. Initially, McLeod kept the menu small, stating that the restaurant's "goal was to build as we go and add some more dishes". As noted by reviewers, the menu simply listed each dish with few other details other than nouns.

After reopening in late January 2011, RIA unveiled a retooling of their menu, with about half of the items being new additions. McLeod's seasonal tasting menu included rabbit with foie gras, common sole with leeks, pain de mie, and Peking duck breast with blood orange, fennel and cumin. At the same time, they also introduced a limited-time table d'hôte menu called the "Ria Lucky Seven", where one of seven parties got to experience a three-course meal with champagne for $75.

After McLeod's departure, RIA introduced items like a pop-up seven-course lamb dinner. They also created a new spring dinner menu.

== Reception ==
RIA was well received by food critics. Jeff Ruby of Chicago described the place as a "polished new spot", as it felt "less like a restaurant visit and more like a banquet on a private island with your own staff." Modern Luxury's Michael Nagrant enjoyed his experience, stating that it was "an oasis—of unpretentious fine dining" and that the establishment was "a five-star restaurant waiting to happen, derailed only by minor details". Martha Bayne of the Chicago Reader praised RIA's grilled sturgeon, as well as the "pink knuckles of lobster and pale scallop dumplings trickled with impeccably clear pale-gold consomme". She described each dish as "an expertly composed work of art". After McLeod's departure as executive chef, the Chicago Tribune's Phil Vettel gave the restaurant a four-star review, stating that "Danny Grant is a taste master."

The restaurant also earned many accolades before its closure. In their April 2010 issue, Chicago named it as their Best New Restaurant of 2010. It also earned two Michelin stars in the Michelin Guide. The Chicago edition of Time Out named RIA's seafood dishes as one of the "100 Best Things We Ate", and the Chicago Reader stated that RIA was one of the best restaurants of 2010. Under Danny Grant, the restaurant maintained its two Michelin stars in 2011. Grant was also nominated for Food & Wine's People's Best New Chef of 2012, which he later won.

== See also ==
- List of French restaurants
- List of Michelin-starred restaurants in Chicago
