= List of Michelin-starred restaurants in Chicago =

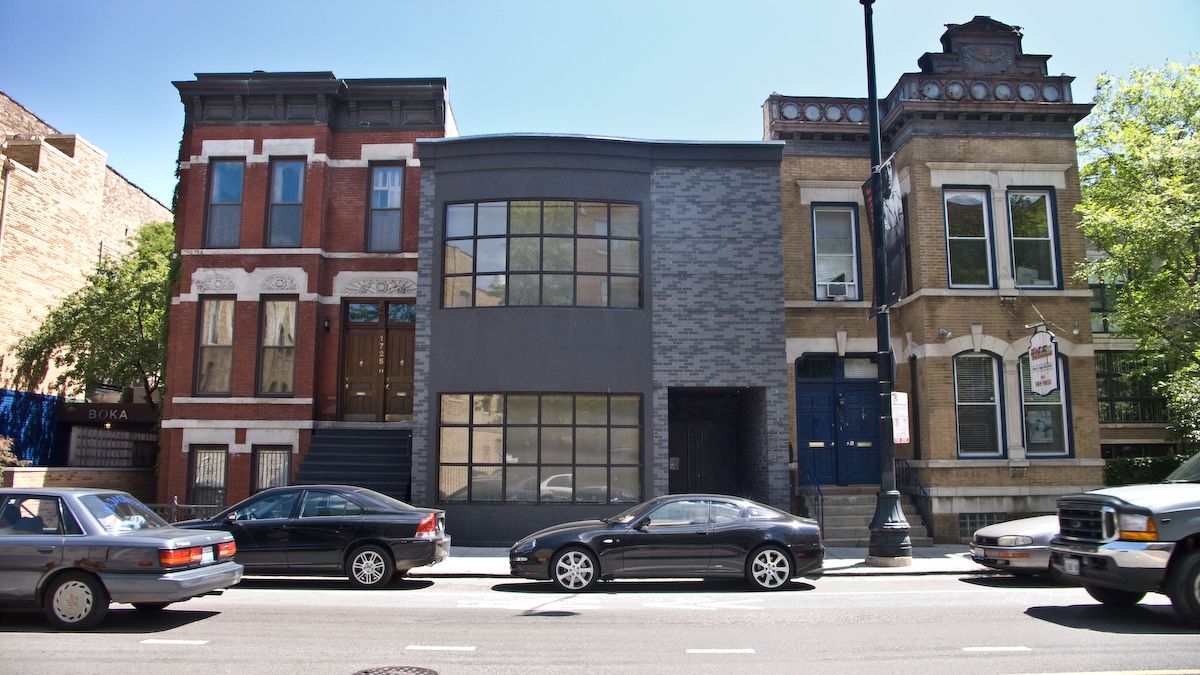
Alinea, a 2 Michelin-starred restaurant in Chicago

The 2025 selection of the Michelin Guide included 20 restaurants in Chicago: one with three stars, four with two stars, and 15 with one star.

Michelin first published the guide in France in 1900 to encourage car travel and tire sales.

Michelin's anonymous inspectors pay for their meals and evaluate restaurants using five criteria: product quality, mastery of cooking techniques, harmony of flavors, the chef's personality as reflected in the cuisine, and consistency over time and across the menu. One star indicates a very good restaurant; two stars recognize excellent cooking worth a detour; and three stars denote exceptional cuisine worth a special journey.

Chicago was the fifth US city to be chosen to have a dedicated Michelin Guide in 2011, after New York City, San Francisco, Los Angeles, and Las Vegas, although the Los Angeles and Las Vegas guides were discontinued in 2010. (Note: Since 2019, L.A. is part of a statewide California guide and Las Vegas is now part of the American Southwest region.) Although earlier editions included restaurants from the suburbs, since 2013, all the restaurants have been located within the city proper.

In 2025, Michelin grouped Chicago's selection with those of New York City and Washington, D.C., along with inaugural selections for Boston and Philadelphia, in the newly created Michelin Guide Northeast Cities edition.

== 2021–2025 lists ==
Key
| 1 Michelin star | One Michelin star |
| 2 Michelin stars | Two Michelin stars |
| 3 Michelin stars | Three Michelin stars |
| — | The restaurant did not receive a star that year |
| Closed | The restaurant is no longer open |

Michelin-starred restaurants
| Name | Cuisine | Location | 2021 | 2022 | 2023 | 2024 | 2025 |
|---|---|---|---|---|---|---|---|
| Acadia | American | Chicago – South Loop | 2 Michelin stars | Closed | | | |
| Alinea | Creative | Chicago – Lincoln Park | 3 Michelin stars | 3 Michelin stars | 3 Michelin stars | 3 Michelin stars | 2 Michelin stars |
| Atelier | American | Chicago – Lincoln Square | — | — | 1 Michelin star | 1 Michelin star | 1 Michelin star |
| Boka | American | Chicago – Lincoln Park | 1 Michelin star | 1 Michelin star | 1 Michelin star | 1 Michelin star | 1 Michelin star |
| Cariño | Mexican | Chicago – Uptown | — | — | — | 1 Michelin star | 1 Michelin star |
| Claudia | Contemporary | Chicago – Bucktown | — | 1 Michelin star | Closed | | |
| EL Ideas | Contemporary | Chicago – Douglas Park | 1 Michelin star | 1 Michelin star | 1 Michelin star | 1 Michelin star | 1 Michelin star |
| Elizabeth | Contemporary | Chicago – Ravenswood | 1 Michelin star | 1 Michelin star | Closed | | |
| Elske | Nordic | Chicago – West Loop | 1 Michelin star | 1 Michelin star | 1 Michelin star | 1 Michelin star | 1 Michelin star |
| Entente | American | Chicago – River North | 1 Michelin star | Closed | | | |
| Esmé | Contemporary | Chicago – Lincoln Park | — | 1 Michelin star | 1 Michelin star | 1 Michelin star | 1 Michelin star |
| Ever | Creative | Chicago – West Loop | 2 Michelin stars | 2 Michelin stars | 2 Michelin stars | 2 Michelin stars | 2 Michelin stars |
| Feld | Contemporary | Chicago – West Town | — | — | — | — | 1 Michelin star |
| Galit | Middle Eastern | Chicago – Lincoln Park | — | 1 Michelin star | 1 Michelin star | 1 Michelin star | 1 Michelin star |
| Goosefoot | Contemporary | Chicago – Ravenswood | 1 Michelin star | 1 Michelin star | — | Closed | |
| Indienne | Indian | Chicago – River North | — | — | 1 Michelin star | 1 Michelin star | 1 Michelin star |
| Kasama | Filipino | Chicago – West Town | — | 1 Michelin star | 1 Michelin star | 1 Michelin star | 2 Michelin stars |
| Mako | Japanese | Chicago – West Loop | 1 Michelin star | 1 Michelin star | 1 Michelin star | 1 Michelin star | 1 Michelin star |
| Moody Tongue | Contemporary | Chicago – South Loop | 2 Michelin stars | 2 Michelin stars | 2 Michelin stars | 1 Michelin star | 1 Michelin star |
| Next | Contemporary | Chicago – West Loop | 1 Michelin star | 1 Michelin star | 1 Michelin star | 1 Michelin star | 1 Michelin star |
| North Pond | American | Chicago – Lincoln Park | 1 Michelin star | 1 Michelin star | — | — | — |
| Omakase Yume | Japanese | Chicago – West Loop | 1 Michelin star | 1 Michelin star | 1 Michelin star | — | — |
| Oriole | Contemporary | Chicago – West Loop | 2 Michelin stars | 2 Michelin stars | 2 Michelin stars | 2 Michelin stars | 2 Michelin stars |
| Parachute | Korean | Chicago – Avondale | 1 Michelin star | — | — | Closed | |
| Porto | Portuguese | Chicago – West Town | 1 Michelin star | 1 Michelin star | 1 Michelin star | Closed | |
| Schwa | Contemporary | Chicago – West Town | 1 Michelin star | 1 Michelin star | 1 Michelin star | 1 Michelin star | 1 Michelin star |
| Sepia | American | Chicago – West Loop | 1 Michelin star | 1 Michelin star | 1 Michelin star | 1 Michelin star | 1 Michelin star |
| Smyth | Contemporary | Chicago – West Loop | 2 Michelin stars | 2 Michelin stars | 3 Michelin stars | 3 Michelin stars | 3 Michelin stars |
| Spiaggia | Italian | Chicago – Magnificent Mile | 1 Michelin star | Closed | | | |
| Temporis | Contemporary | Chicago – West Town | 1 Michelin star | 1 Michelin star | 1 Michelin star | Closed | |
| Topolobampo | Mexican | Chicago – River North | 1 Michelin star | 1 Michelin star | 1 Michelin star | 1 Michelin star | 1 Michelin star |
| Yūgen | Japanese | Chicago – West Loop | 1 Michelin star | Closed | | | |
| Reference | | | | | | | |

== 2011–2020 lists ==
Key
| 1 Michelin star | One Michelin star |
| 2 Michelin stars | Two Michelin stars |
| 3 Michelin stars | Three Michelin stars |
| — | The restaurant did not receive a star that year |
| Closed | The restaurant is no longer open |

Michelin-starred restaurants
| Name | Cuisine | Location | 2011 | 2012 | 2013 | 2014 | 2015 | 2016 | 2017 | 2018 | 2019 | 2020 |
|---|---|---|---|---|---|---|---|---|---|---|---|---|
| 42 Grams | American | Chicago – Uptown | — | — | — | — | 2 Michelin stars | 2 Michelin stars | 2 Michelin stars | Closed | | |
| Acadia | American | Chicago – South Loop | — | — | 1 Michelin star | 1 Michelin star | 1 Michelin star | 2 Michelin stars | 2 Michelin stars | 2 Michelin stars | 2 Michelin stars | 2 Michelin stars |
| Alinea | Creative | Chicago – Lincoln Park | 3 Michelin stars | 3 Michelin stars | 3 Michelin stars | 3 Michelin stars | 3 Michelin stars | 3 Michelin stars | 3 Michelin stars | 3 Michelin stars | 3 Michelin stars | 3 Michelin stars |
| Avenues | Contemporary | Chicago – Magnificent Mile | 2 Michelin stars | Closed | | | | | | | | |
| Band of Bohemia | Gastropub | Chicago – Ravenswood | — | — | — | — | — | — | 1 Michelin star | 1 Michelin star | 1 Michelin star | Closed |
| Blackbird | Contemporary | Chicago – West Loop | 1 Michelin star | 1 Michelin star | 1 Michelin star | 1 Michelin star | 1 Michelin star | 1 Michelin star | 1 Michelin star | 1 Michelin star | 1 Michelin star | Closed |
| Boka | American | Chicago – Lincoln Park | 1 Michelin star | 1 Michelin star | 1 Michelin star | 1 Michelin star | 1 Michelin star | 1 Michelin star | 1 Michelin star | 1 Michelin star | 1 Michelin star | 1 Michelin star |
| Bonsoirée | French | Chicago – Logan Square | 1 Michelin star | 1 Michelin star | Closed | | | | | | | |
| Charlie Trotter's | American | Chicago – Lincoln Park | 2 Michelin stars | 2 Michelin stars | Closed | | | | | | | |
| Crofton on Wells | Contemporary | Chicago – River North | 1 Michelin star | — | Closed | | | | | | | |
| Courtright's | American | Cook County – Willow Springs | — | 1 Michelin star | — | Closed | | | | | | |
| Dusek's Board & Beer | Gastropub | Chicago – Pilsen | — | — | — | — | — | 1 Michelin star | 1 Michelin star | 1 Michelin star | 1 Michelin star | — |
| EL Ideas | Contemporary | Chicago – Douglas Park | — | — | — | 1 Michelin star | 1 Michelin star | 1 Michelin star | 1 Michelin star | 1 Michelin star | 1 Michelin star | 1 Michelin star |
| Elizabeth | Contemporary | Chicago – Ravenswood | — | — | — | 1 Michelin star | 1 Michelin star | 1 Michelin star | 1 Michelin star | 1 Michelin star | 1 Michelin star | 1 Michelin star |
| Elske | Nordic | Chicago – West Loop | — | — | — | — | — | — | — | 1 Michelin star | 1 Michelin star | 1 Michelin star |
| Entente (Note: The restaurant closed in 2021) | American | Chicago – River North | — | — | — | — | — | — | — | 1 Michelin star | 1 Michelin star | 1 Michelin star |
| Everest (Note: The restaurant closed in 2020) | French | Chicago – Loop | 1 Michelin star | 1 Michelin star | 1 Michelin star | 1 Michelin star | 1 Michelin star | 1 Michelin star | 1 Michelin star | 1 Michelin star | 1 Michelin star | 1 Michelin star |
| Goosefoot | Contemporary | Chicago – Ravenswood | — | — | 1 Michelin star | 1 Michelin star | 1 Michelin star | 1 Michelin star | 1 Michelin star | 1 Michelin star | 1 Michelin star | 1 Michelin star |
| Grace | Contemporary | Chicago – West Loop | — | — | — | 2 Michelin stars | 3 Michelin stars | 3 Michelin stars | 3 Michelin stars | 3 Michelin stars | Closed | |
| Graham Elliot | American | Chicago – River North | 1 Michelin star | 1 Michelin star | 2 Michelin stars | 2 Michelin stars | Closed | | | | | |
| GreenRiver | American | Chicago – Streeterville | — | — | — | — | — | — | 1 Michelin star | 1 Michelin star | Closed | |
| Kikko | Japanese | Chicago – West Loop | — | — | — | — | — | — | — | — | — | 1 Michelin star |
| L2O | Seafood | Chicago – Lincoln Park | 3 Michelin stars | 1 Michelin star | 2 Michelin stars | 2 Michelin stars | 2 Michelin stars | Closed | | | | |
| Longman & Eagle | Gastropub | Chicago – Logan Square | 1 Michelin star | 1 Michelin star | 1 Michelin star | 1 Michelin star | 1 Michelin star | 1 Michelin star | 1 Michelin star | — | — | — |
| Mako | Japanese | Chicago – West Loop | — | — | — | — | — | — | — | — | — | 1 Michelin star |
| Mexique | Mexican | Chicago - West Town | — | — | 1 Michelin star | 1 Michelin star | — | — | — | Closed | | |
| Moody Tongue | Contemporary | Chicago – South Loop | — | — | — | — | — | — | — | — | — | 2 Michelin stars |
| Moto | Creative | Chicago - West Loop | — | 1 Michelin star | 1 Michelin star | 1 Michelin star | 1 Michelin star | Closed | | | | |
| Naha | Mediterranean | Chicago – River North | 1 Michelin star | 1 Michelin star | 1 Michelin star | 1 Michelin star | 1 Michelin star | 1 Michelin star | 1 Michelin star | 1 Michelin star | Closed | |
| Next | Contemporary | Chicago – West Loop | — | — | — | — | — | — | — | — | — | 1 Michelin star |
| NoMI | American | Chicago – Magnificent Mile | 1 Michelin star | — | — | — | — | — | — | — | — | — |
| North Pond | American | Chicago – Lincoln Park | — | — | — | 1 Michelin star | 1 Michelin star | 1 Michelin star | 1 Michelin star | 1 Michelin star | 1 Michelin star | 1 Michelin star |
| Omakase Yume | Japanese | Chicago – West Loop | — | — | — | — | — | — | — | — | — | 1 Michelin star |
| Oriole | Contemporary | Chicago – West Loop | — | — | — | — | — | — | 2 Michelin stars | 2 Michelin stars | 2 Michelin stars | 2 Michelin stars |
| Parachute | Korean | Chicago – Avondale | — | — | — | — | — | 1 Michelin star | 1 Michelin star | 1 Michelin star | 1 Michelin star | 1 Michelin star |
| RIA | French | Chicago – Gold Coast | 2 Michelin stars | 2 Michelin stars | Closed | | | | | | | |
| Roister | Contemporary | Chicago – West Loop | — | — | — | — | — | — | 1 Michelin star | 1 Michelin star | 1 Michelin star | — |
| Schwa | Contemporary | Chicago – West Town | 1 Michelin star | 1 Michelin star | 1 Michelin star | 1 Michelin star | 1 Michelin star | 1 Michelin star | 1 Michelin star | 1 Michelin star | 1 Michelin star | 1 Michelin star |
| Seasons | Contemporary | Chicago – Magnificent Mile | 1 Michelin star | 1 Michelin star | Closed | | | | | | | |
| Senza | American | Chicago – Lake View | — | — | 1 Michelin star | 1 Michelin star | Closed | | | | | |
| Sepia | American | Chicago – West Loop | 1 Michelin star | 1 Michelin star | 1 Michelin star | 1 Michelin star | 1 Michelin star | 1 Michelin star | 1 Michelin star | 1 Michelin star | 1 Michelin star | 1 Michelin star |
| Sixteen | American | Chicago – River North | 1 Michelin star | — | 1 Michelin star | 2 Michelin stars | 2 Michelin stars | 2 Michelin stars | 2 Michelin stars | 2 Michelin stars | Closed | |
| Smyth | Contemporary | Chicago – West Loop | — | — | — | — | — | — | 1 Michelin star | 2 Michelin stars | 2 Michelin stars | 2 Michelin stars |
| Spiaggia (Note: The restaurant closed in 2021) | Italian | Chicago – Magnificent Mile | 1 Michelin star | 1 Michelin star | 1 Michelin star | 1 Michelin star | 1 Michelin star | 1 Michelin star | 1 Michelin star | 1 Michelin star | 1 Michelin star | 1 Michelin star |
| Takashi | Japanese | Chicago – Bucktown | 1 Michelin star | 1 Michelin star | 1 Michelin star | 1 Michelin star | 1 Michelin star | Closed | | | | |
| Temporis | Contemporary | Chicago – West Town | — | — | — | — | — | — | — | — | 1 Michelin star | 1 Michelin star |
| Topolobampo | Mexican | Chicago – River North | 1 Michelin star | 1 Michelin star | 1 Michelin star | 1 Michelin star | 1 Michelin star | 1 Michelin star | 1 Michelin star | 1 Michelin star | 1 Michelin star | 1 Michelin star |
| The Lobby | Contemporary | Chicago – Magnificent Mile | — | — | — | 1 Michelin star | — | — | — | — | — | — |
| Tru | French | Chicago – Streeterville | 1 Michelin star | 1 Michelin star | 1 Michelin star | 1 Michelin star | 1 Michelin star | 1 Michelin star | 2 Michelin stars | Closed | | |
| Vie | French | Cook County – Western Springs | 1 Michelin star | 1 Michelin star | — | — | — | — | — | — | — | — |
| Yūgen | Japanese | Chicago – West Loop | — | — | — | — | — | — | — | — | — | 1 Michelin star |
| Reference | | | | | | | | | | | | |

== See also ==
- List of Michelin 3-star restaurants in the United States
- List of Michelin-starred restaurants in American Northeast Cities
- List of restaurants

== Bibliography ==
- Michelin Guide Chicago 2011. Michelin Travel Publications. 2011. ISBN 978-2-06-715652-4.
- Michelin Guide Chicago 2012. Michelin Travel Publications. 2012. ISBN 978-2-06-716622-6.
- Michelin Guide Chicago 2013. Michelin Travel Publications. 2013. ISBN 978-2-06-717696-6.
- Michelin Guide Chicago 2014. Michelin Travel Publications. 2014. ISBN 978-2-06-718699-6.
- Michelin Guide Chicago 2015. Michelin Travel Publications. 2015. ISBN 978-2-06-719412-0.
- Michelin Guide Chicago 2016. Michelin Travel Publications. 2016. ISBN 978-2-06-720293-1.
- Michelin Guide Chicago 2017. Michelin Travel Publications. 2017. ISBN 978-2-06-721238-1.
- Michelin Guide Chicago 2018. Michelin Travel Publications. 2018. ISBN 978-2-06-722088-1.
- Michelin Guide Chicago 2019. Michelin Travel Publications. 2019. ISBN 978-2-06-723062-0.
- Michelin Guide Chicago 2020. Michelin Travel Publications. 2020. ISBN 978-2-06-723891-6.
