= Oriole (restaurant) =

- Interactive map of Oriole

Restaurant information
- Established: 2016; 10 years ago
- Owner: Noah Sandoval
- Head chef: Noah Sandoval
- Food type: Contemporary American
- Dress code: None
- Rating: (Michelin Guide)
- Location: 661 W Walnut Street, Chicago, Illinois, 60661, United States
- Coordinates: 41°53′10.2″N 87°38′42.6″W
- Website: www.oriolechicago.com

Oriole is a restaurant in West Loop, Chicago. It has earned two Michelin stars, among a small group of Chicago restaurants to do so. It is a New American tasting menu restaurant.

The executive chef is Noah Sandoval.

The Chicago Tribune rated it four stars. Oriole does not have a dress code.

== Awards and honors ==
The World's 50 Best Restaurants list produced by the UK media company William Reed rated Oriole #91 in the world, several spots ahead of #97 Benu. The executive chef Noah Sandoval won “Best Chef: Great Lakes” at the 2025 James Beard Awards.

== See also ==
- List of Michelin-starred restaurants in Chicago
- Alinea
- Tru
- Grace
- List of New American restaurants
