= The Musket Room =

Restaurant in New York City

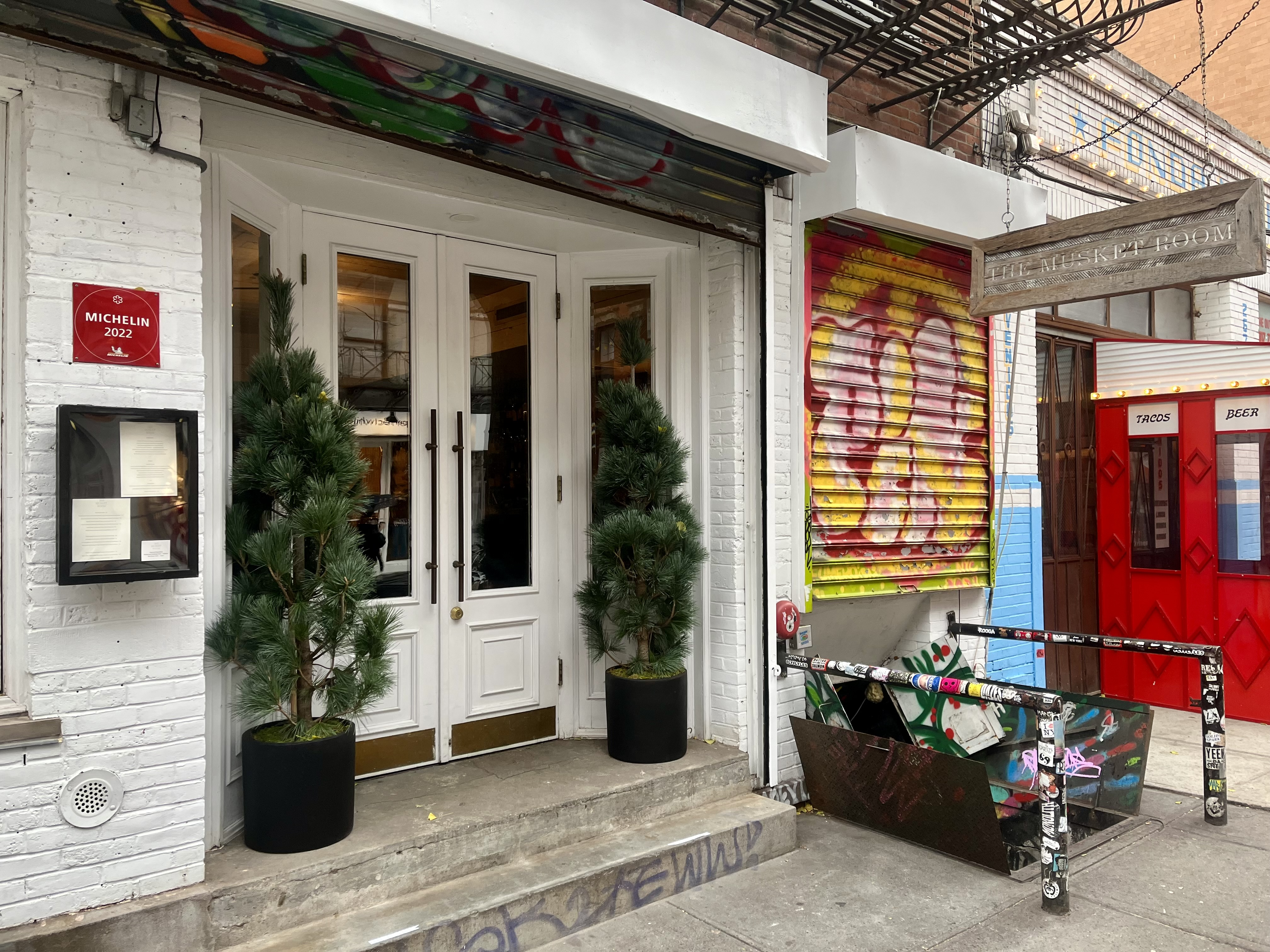
- The Musket Room in December 2023
- Interactive map of The Musket Room

Restaurant information
- Established: June 2013
- Rating: (Michelin Guide)
- Location: 265 Elizabeth Street, New York, New York, 10012
- Coordinates: 40°43′26.1″N 73°59′37.8″W

The Musket Room is a restaurant in New York City. The restaurant originally served food inspired by the cuisine of New Zealand, but has since expanded its menu. The restaurant won a Michelin star in 2014.

== History ==
The restaurant opened in June 2013. The restaurant was founded by husband and wife Matt and Barbara Lambert and "developing partner" Jennifer Vitagliano. Matt and Barbara eventually left The Musket Room in 2019.

=== Raf's ===
Chef Mary Attea, Musket Room pastry chef Camari Mick, Jennifer Vitagliano, and Nicole Vitagliano opened Raf's in 2023, located near The Musket Room. Raf's, characterized by Nina Friend in Air Mail as an all-day café, serves pastries on weekend days and serves a full dinner at night.

The space occupied by Raf's was formerly occupied by Angie's, and, subsequently, Parisi Bakery.

== Reviews and accolades ==
=== Reviews ===
In a positive 2013 review published by The New York Times, Ligaya Mishan praised the restaurant's food as "ambitious and meticulously detailed".

Pete Wells wrote a positive review, also published by the New York Times, in 2022. Wells highlighted what he interpreted as a "border-hopping" approach to the menu by chef Mary Attea, noting inspiration from Spanish, Eastern European, and Middle Eastern dishes and cuisine. Wells also praised the restaurant's atmosphere, writing that a "lot of Musket Room’s energy radiates from the bar", which he credited to the fact that the restaurant does not allow patrons to reserve bar seating.

=== Accolades ===
The restaurant won a Michelin star after four months of operation, joining the Michelin Guide in 2014.

Mary Attea was nominated for the James Beard Award for Best chef: New York State in 2023. Junghyun Park of Atomix ultimately won.

In 2023, in a rare occurrence, several Michelin star chefs dined together at the restaurant including Mary Attea and Camari Mick as well as Malyna Si of Orlando's famous restaurant Capa.

In October 2025, Apple TV aired a series entitled Knife Edge: Chasing Michelin Stars, in which The Musket Room was featured and viewers see chef Mary Attea's journey to maintain her Michelin star for The Musket Room. The restaurant lost its Michelin star rating in 2026.

== See also ==
- List of Michelin-starred restaurants in New York City
