= Indienne (restaurant) =

Indian restaurant in Chicago, Illinois

- Interactive map of Indienne

Restaurant information
- Rating: 1 Michelin star
- Location: 217 West Huron Street, Chicago, Illinois, 60654
- Coordinates: 41°53′40″N 87°38′06″W
- Reservations: No

Indienne is an Indian restaurant in Chicago, Illinois. The restaurant was awarded a Michelin star in 2023.

== History ==
The restaurant was opened in 2022 by Sujan Sarkar. The location occupied by Indienne was formerly home to Graham Elliot.

== Accolades ==
In 2023, the restaurant was awarded a Michelin star, becoming the first Michelin-starred Indian restaurant in Chicago.

In 2024, Chef Sujan Sarkar was nominated for James Beard Awards’ “Best Chef: Great Lakes” category.

In 2025, Indienne was listed among the Michelin Guide's one-star Chicago restaurants. It was named Restaurant of the Year at the 2026 Jean Banchet Awards.

== See also ==
- List of Michelin-starred restaurants in Chicago
