= Vie (restaurant) =

Restaurant in Western Springs, Illinois, U.S.

- Interactive map of Vie

Restaurant information
- Established: 2004
- Closed: 2023
- Previous owner: Paul Virant
- Location: 4471 Lawn Ave, Western Springs, Illinois, 60558, United States
- Coordinates: 41°48′30.5″N 87°54′0.5″W

Vie was a restaurant in Western Springs, Illinois. Chef-owner Paul Virant opened it in 2004. It received one Michelin star in the inaugural 2011 Chicago guide.

== History ==
Vie closed in October 2023 after 19 years at 4471 Lawn Avenue amid a landlord dispute. In 2024, Virant opened Petite Vie nearby as a French cafe and brasserie.

== See also ==
- List of Michelin-starred restaurants in Chicago
