= Sepia (restaurant) =

Restaurant in the West Loop neighborhood of Chicago, Illinois, US

- Interactive map of Sepia

Restaurant information
- Owner: Andrew Zimmerman
- Head chef: Kyle Cottle
- Food type: American Contemporary
- Rating: (Michelin Guide)
- Location: 123 N Jefferson Street, Chicago, IL, 60661, United States
- Coordinates: 41.88394°N 87.64246°W
- Website: www.sepiachicago.com

Sepia is a mid-sized, upscale restaurant run by owner Emmanuel Nony and Executive Chef Kyle Cottle located in the West Loop neighborhood of Chicago, Illinois (United States). The menu is classified as New American cuisine, and focuses on local, seasonal products.

== Description ==
Sepia's beverage program features a selection of wines from around the world. More than 20 wines by-the-glass and 400 bottles are available, including unique varietals from Slovenia, Hungary, Croatia and Greece, as well as more familiar wine destinations.

== History ==
Built into a historical 1890s print shop, Sepia was established in 2007 as restaurateur Emmanuel Nony's first independent venture.

The renovation for the restaurant, designed by Gary Lee, included putting in a custom-tile, Art Nouveau floor and hand-crafted millwork in order to enhance the historical qualities of the building. Sepia also uses vintage stemware for their tables matching the vintage interior decor of the restaurant.

Chef Andrew Zimmerman departed in December 2025.

== Reception ==
- Michelin Guide, One star rating from 2011-present
- Rising Star Chef Award by StarChefs.com, 2011
- Jean Banchet Awards nomination for “Chef of the Year,” 2011 & 2012 and winner of “Restaurant of the Year” 2013
- James Beard Foundation Award finalist for "Best Chef: Great Lakes," 2012 & 2013
- Crain's Chicago Business “Best of Business Dining” 2012
- Three-star reviews from Chicago Tribune, and Chicago Sun-Times and 3.5 stars in Chicago magazine

== See also ==
- List of Michelin-starred restaurants in Chicago
- List of New American restaurants
