= Parachute (restaurant) =

Korean restaurant in Chicago, Illinois, U.S.

- Interactive map of Parachute

Restaurant information
- Established: May 2014
- Closed: March 2024
- Food type: Korean
- Location: 3500 N. Elston Ave., Chicago, Illinois, 60618, United States
- Coordinates: 41°56′41.3″N 87°42′23.1″W

Parachute was a restaurant in the Avondale neighborhood of Chicago, Illinois, operated by chefs Beverly Kim and Johnny Clark. The restaurant served Korean cuisine (previously Korean American, or fusion). It received a Michelin star in the 2016 edition of the Chicago guide. Kim and Clark received the James Beard Foundation Award for Best Chef: Great Lakes in 2019.

== History ==
Kim and Clark opened Parachute in May 2014. The restaurant closed its dining room in March 2020 during the COVID-19 pandemic and later offered takeout before closing altogether for renovations. It reopened its dining room on May 24, 2022.

== Closure and rebranding ==
The restaurant closed in March 2024 for a new concept at its Elston Avenue location. The space reopened as Parachute HiFi, a listening bar and restaurant, in September 2024.

== See also ==
- List of defunct restaurants of the United States
- List of Korean restaurants
- List of Michelin-starred restaurants in Chicago
