= North Pond (restaurant) =

Restaurant in Chicago, Illinois, U.S.

- Interactive map of North Pond

Restaurant information
- Food type: American
- Location: 2610 North Cannon Drive, Chicago, Illinois, 60614, United States
- Coordinates: 41°55′47.5″N 87°38′15″W

North Pond is a restaurant in Chicago, in the U.S. state of Illinois. The restaurant serves American cuisine and has received a Michelin star. Frommer's has rated North Pond 3 out of 3 stars.

North Pond occupies a 1912 building in Lincoln Park that was originally used as a warming shelter for ice skaters. Bruce Sherman left North Pond in November 2019 after two decades; the restaurant reopened in 2020 with César Murillo as executive chef.

== See also ==
- List of Michelin-starred restaurants in Chicago
