= NoMI =

Restaurant in Chicago, Illinois, U.S.

- Interactive map of NoMI

Restaurant information
- Location: 800 N. Michigan Ave., Chicago, Illinois, 60611, United States
- Coordinates: 41°53′49″N 87°37′30.5″W

NoMI (also known as NoMI Garden and NoMI Kitchen) is a restaurant in Chicago, in the U.S. state of Illinois.

NoMI was operating at the Park Hyatt Chicago by 2001. Following a five-month renovation, it reopened as NoMI Kitchen on June 3, 2011, with a more casual, open-kitchen concept. NoMI reopened in June 2022 after a five-month closure for remodeling.

== See also ==
- List of Michelin-starred restaurants in Chicago
