= Dusek's Board & Beer =

Restaurant in Chicago, Illinois, U.S.

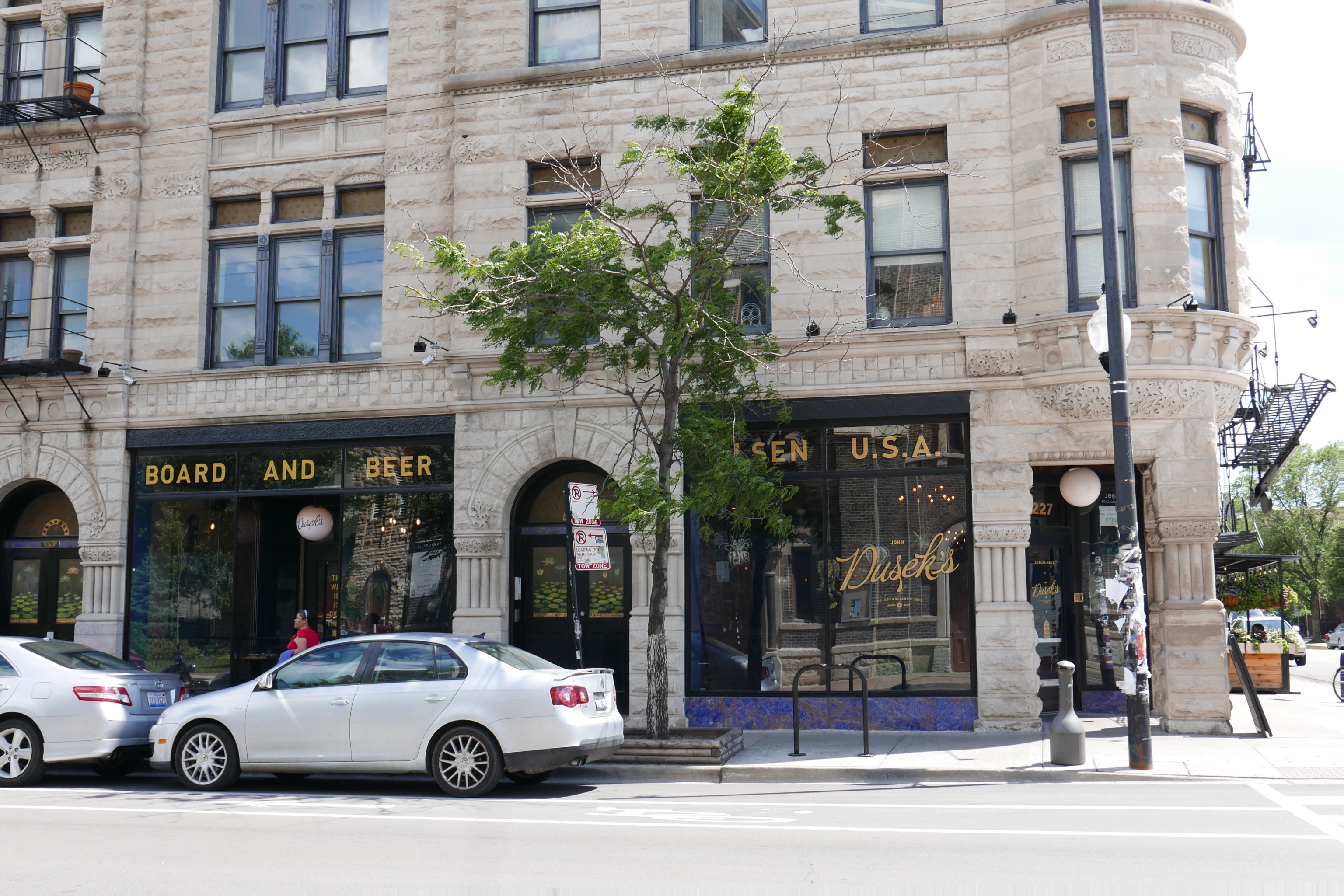
- Interactive map of Dusek's Board & Beer

Restaurant information
- Established: 2013
- Closed: December 31, 2023
- Chef: Jared Wentworth
- Food type: American
- Location: 1227 W. 18th St., Chicago, Illinois, 60608, United States
- Coordinates: 41°51′28.2″N 87°39′27″W

Dusek's was a restaurant in Chicago, Illinois. The gastropub served American cuisine.

== History ==
Dusek's opened in 2013 in the Thalia Hall building. Bruce Finkelman and Craig Golden's 16" On Center hospitality group developed it as a replacement for Ristorante Al Teatro, with Jared Wentworth as the opening executive chef.

Dusek's was named a Bib Gourmand in the 2015 Michelin Guide Chicago. Michelin awarded the restaurant one star for the 2016 guide.

Dusek's permanently closed after dinner service on December 31, 2023. Thalia Hall, Tack Room, and Punch House remained open.

== See also ==
- List of Michelin-starred restaurants in Chicago
