= Porto (restaurant) =

Restaurant in Chicago, Illinois, U.S.

- Interactive map of Porto

Restaurant information
- Established: December 3, 2019
- Closed: 2023
- Owners: Dani Alonso; Celeste Group; Bonhomme Group
- Manager: Colin Hofer
- Head chef: Marcos Campos
- Pastry chef: Shannah Primiano
- Food type: Portuguese, Spanish
- Location: 1600 W. Chicago Ave., Chicago, Cook, Illinois, 60622, United States
- Coordinates: 41°53′46.5″N 87°40′3″W
- Seating capacity: 26
- Website: www.portochicago.com

Porto was a Portuguese and Spanish restaurant in Chicago, Illinois. The restaurant served seafood sourced from Portugal and Spain, mainly canned seafood known as conservas. It was established in December 2019 by owner Dani Alonso and received a Michelin star in 2021, before closing in 2023.

== Description ==
Porto operated on 1600 West Chicago Avenue, at the intersection of Chicago and Ashland Avenue, in the West Town neighborhood of Chicago. The 2,000-square-foot (190 m^{2}) restaurant had a seating capacity of 26 people, and the interior had an open kitchen and a wine bar. Imported materials were used, such as a bookshelf repurposed as a wine cabinet, wood from Spanish fishing boats, and granite from the Iberian Coast, all below stone-carved chandeliers.

=== Menu ===
Porto mainly served conservas, seafood stored in a tin can. The ingredients were sourced from Portugal and Spain and were cooked over a live fire or wood-powered grill. Among seafood options was the Bacalhau Assado, which was roasted cod with black garlic olive oil. Desserts included a jamón-flavored ice cream.

== History ==
Porto was established on December 3, 2019, by Dani Alonso, from a collaboration between owners Celeste Group and Bonhomme Hospitality Group. The business operated in a space previously occupied by Byline Bank. The restaurant closed in mid-2023, and plans to open a Japanese restaurant named Hiro Izakaya were announced on March 6, 2025.

== Reception ==
Frommer's rated Porto two out of three stars, praising its wine selection but showing concern for prices. The restaurant had received one Michelin star in 2021, denoting "high quality cooking" that is "worth a stop".

== See also ==
- List of Michelin-starred restaurants in Chicago
- List of seafood restaurants
