= Ever (restaurant) =

Restaurant in Chicago, Illinois, U.S.

- Interactive map of Ever

Restaurant information
- Established: 2020
- Owner: Curtis Duffy
- Head chef: Curtis Duffy
- Food type: Modern
- Rating: (Michelin Guide)
- Location: 1340 W. Fulton Market, Chicago, Illinois, 60607, United States
- Coordinates: 41°53′13″N 87°39′37.5″W
- Website: www.ever-restaurant.com

Ever is a restaurant in Chicago, Illinois, United States. Established in July 2020, the restaurant earned two Michelin stars in the 2021-2025 Michelin Guides.

The restaurant is co-owned by chef Curtis Duffy and his business partner Michael Muser, respectively former head chef and general manager at Grace, a 3-star Michelin restaurant that was abruptly closed in December 2017 after the duo's offer to buy the restaurant was rejected by its investor-owner.

== In popular culture ==
A fictionalized version of Ever, filmed in the actual restaurant but shown to have a different and significantly longer history, was featured in the TV series The Bear during the second-season episode "Forks". Ever also featured in the season-three finale "Forever."

== See also ==
- List of Michelin-starred restaurants in Chicago
