= Blackbird (restaurant) =

Defunct restaurant in Chicago, Illinois, U.S.

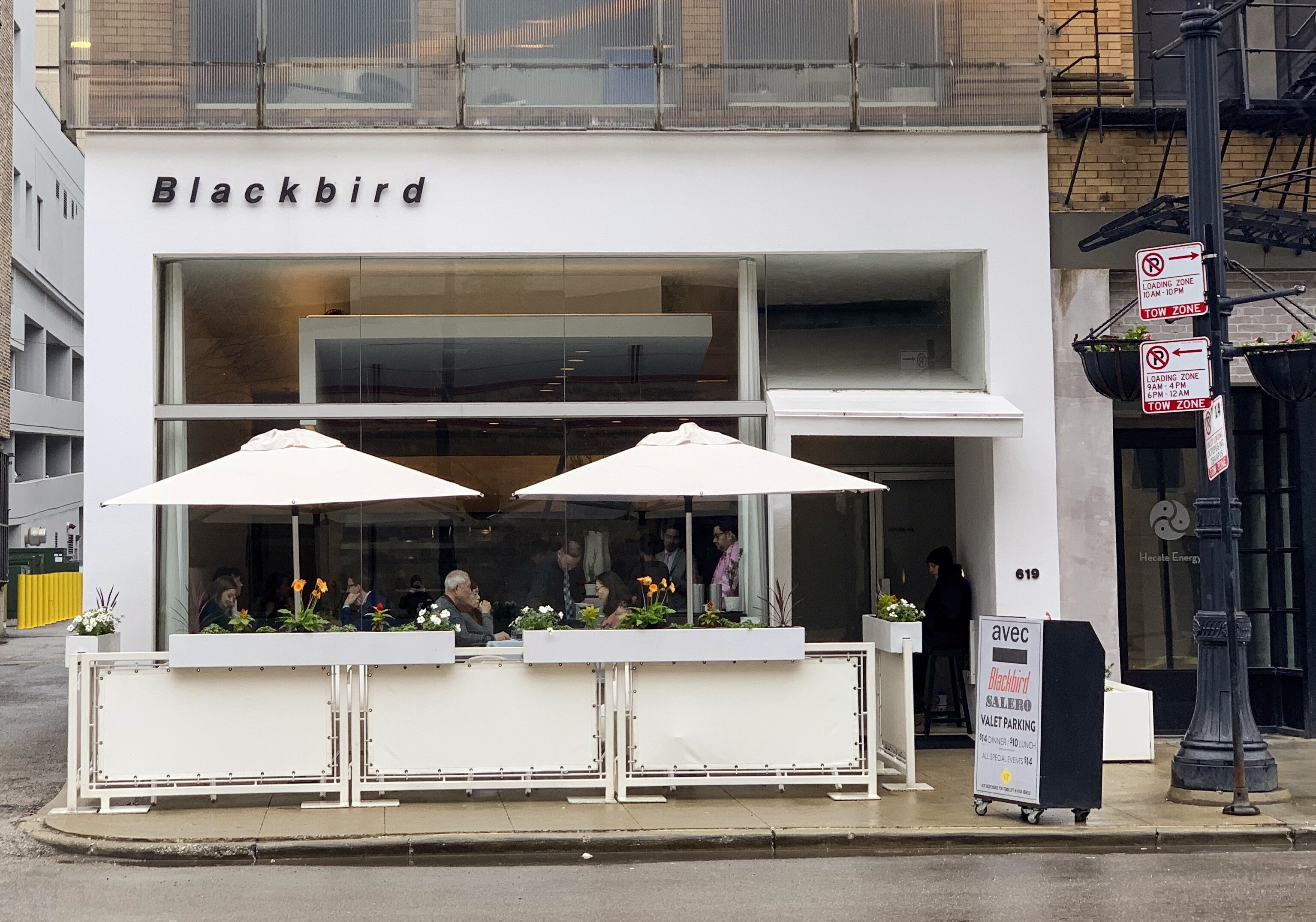
- Interactive map of Blackbird

Restaurant information
- Closed: June 2020
- Rating: (Michelin Guide)
- Location: 619 W. Randolph St., Chicago, Illinois, 60661, United States
- Coordinates: 41°53′3.5″N 87°38′36.7″W

Blackbird was a Michelin-starred restaurant in Chicago, Illinois, United States. The restaurant closed in June 2020 being unable to operate during the COVID-19 pandemic.

== Recognition ==
Blackbird held a 1-star Michelin rating since the inaugural Chicago guide in 2011 until its closure in 2020. In 2013, they were awarded the James Beard Foundation Award for Outstanding Chef. It also received a local award in 2017 as the Jean Blanchet Restaurant of the Year.

== See also ==
- James Beard Foundation Award: 2010s
- List of defunct restaurants of the United States
- List of Michelin-starred restaurants in Chicago
