= Elizabeth (restaurant) =

Defunct restaurant in Chicago, Illinois, U.S.

- Interactive map of Elizabeth

Restaurant information
- Established: 2012
- Closed: December 22, 2022
- Location: 4835 North Western Avenue, Chicago, Illinois, 60625, United States
- Coordinates: 41°58′10.7″N 87°41′19.4″W

Elizabeth was a Michelin-starred restaurant in Lincoln Square, Chicago, Illinois. Chef Iliana Regan opened it in 2012. It earned its first Michelin star in 2013. Its final service was on December 22, 2022.

== See also ==
- List of defunct restaurants of the United States
- List of Michelin-starred restaurants in Chicago
