= Mako (restaurant) =

Japanese restaurant in Chicago, Illinois, U.S.

- Interactive map of Mako

Restaurant information
- Food type: Japanese
- Rating: (Michelin Guide)
- Location: 731 West Lake Street, Chicago, Illinois, 60661, United States
- Coordinates: 41°53′8″N 87°38′49″W
- Website: www.makochicago.com

Mako is a Japanese restaurant in Chicago, Illinois. It opened in the city's West Loop in March 2019 under chef B.K. Park. Mako received its first Michelin star in the 2020 Chicago guide and was listed among the guide's one-star restaurants in 2025.

== See also ==
- List of Japanese restaurants
- List of Michelin-starred restaurants in Chicago
