= Akahoshi Ramen =

Ramen restaurant in Chicago, Illinois, U.S.

- Interactive map of Akahoshi Ramen

Restaurant information
- Established: November 2023
- Owner: Mike Satinover
- Head chef: Mike Satinover
- Location: 2340 North California Avenue, Chicago, Illinois, 60647, United States
- Coordinates: 41°55′26″N 87°41′51″W
- Website: www.akahoshiramen.com

Akahoshi Ramen is a ramen restaurant in the Logan Square neighborhood of Chicago, Illinois. It opened in November 2023 under chef and owner Mike Satinover, who had developed an online following as "Ramen_Lord" through detailed recipes and pop-up dinners. Its concise menu centers on house-made, crinkled Sapporo-style noodles served in miso and shoyu ramen and on two brothless dishes, tantanmen and aburasoba. The Chicago Tribune gave the restaurant three stars, and Bon Appétit named it one of the 20 best new restaurants of 2024.

== History ==
Satinover became interested in ramen while studying Japanese at Hokkaido University in Sapporo in 2009 and 2010. After returning to the United States, he began making ramen at home and documenting his experiments online. He began posting detailed recipes on Reddit under the name Ramen_Lord in 2013. In 2020, he and his twin brother, Scott Satinover, released a free 137-page electronic book, The Ramen_Lord Book of Ramen, compiling his recipes and research.

Satinover held his first ramen pop-up in 2017 at Ramen Lab, a New York venue operated by noodle maker Sun Noodle, followed by events in Chicago and other cities. His Chicago pop-ups sold as many as 90 seats within 30 seconds, and he used the name Akahoshi Ramen for the events. In February 2023, he announced plans for a permanent restaurant at 2340 North California Avenue. The restaurant opened in late November 2023. Its name translates as "red star" and refers to the red stars on the flags of both Chicago and Hokkaido.

The 55-seat interior was designed by Chicago firm Siren Betty. It has an open kitchen, a seven-seat counter, booths, window seating, and a 20-seat communal table.

== Menu ==
The regular menu consists of four ramen dishes—Akahoshi miso, shoyu, soupless tantanmen, and aburasoba—along with two rice dishes and a rotating monthly special. The miso and shoyu bowls use thin, crinkled noodles, while the two brothless dishes use thicker noodles. The restaurant makes its noodles in-house.

The signature miso ramen is based on the style associated with Sapporo and uses a blend of three miso pastes, wok-cooked bean sprouts, pork chashu, menma, and scallions. The shoyu ramen is lighter and uses soy-based seasoning, while the tantanmen and aburasoba are served without broth. Satinover kept the menu narrow and omitted common ramen-shop appetizers to concentrate on consistent execution of the noodle dishes.

== Reception ==
Demand was high when Akahoshi Ramen opened: within a week of its debut, reservations were booked through the end of the following month, although the restaurant reserved space for up to 60 walk-in customers each day. The Chicago Tribune review rated it three out of four stars, which the newspaper defined as "excellent". John Ringor of The Infatuation gave it a score of 9.2 out of 10 and rated its ramen the best in Chicago.

In 2024, Bon Appétit included Akahoshi Ramen on its list of the 20 best new restaurants in the United States. Time Out placed it first in its 2025 ranking of Chicago ramen shops. In 2026, Chicago ranked it 20th on its list of the city's 50 best restaurants.
