= Green Door Tavern =

Bar in Chicago, Illinois, USA

- The bar in May 2025
- Formerly: Huron-Orleans Restaurant
- Type: Tavern
- Founded: 1921
- Founder: Vito Giacomoni
- Headquarters: Chicago, United States
- Website: greendoorchicago.com

The Green Door Tavern is reputedly Chicago's oldest surviving drinking establishment. It opened in 1921, but the building dates from 1872.

== History ==
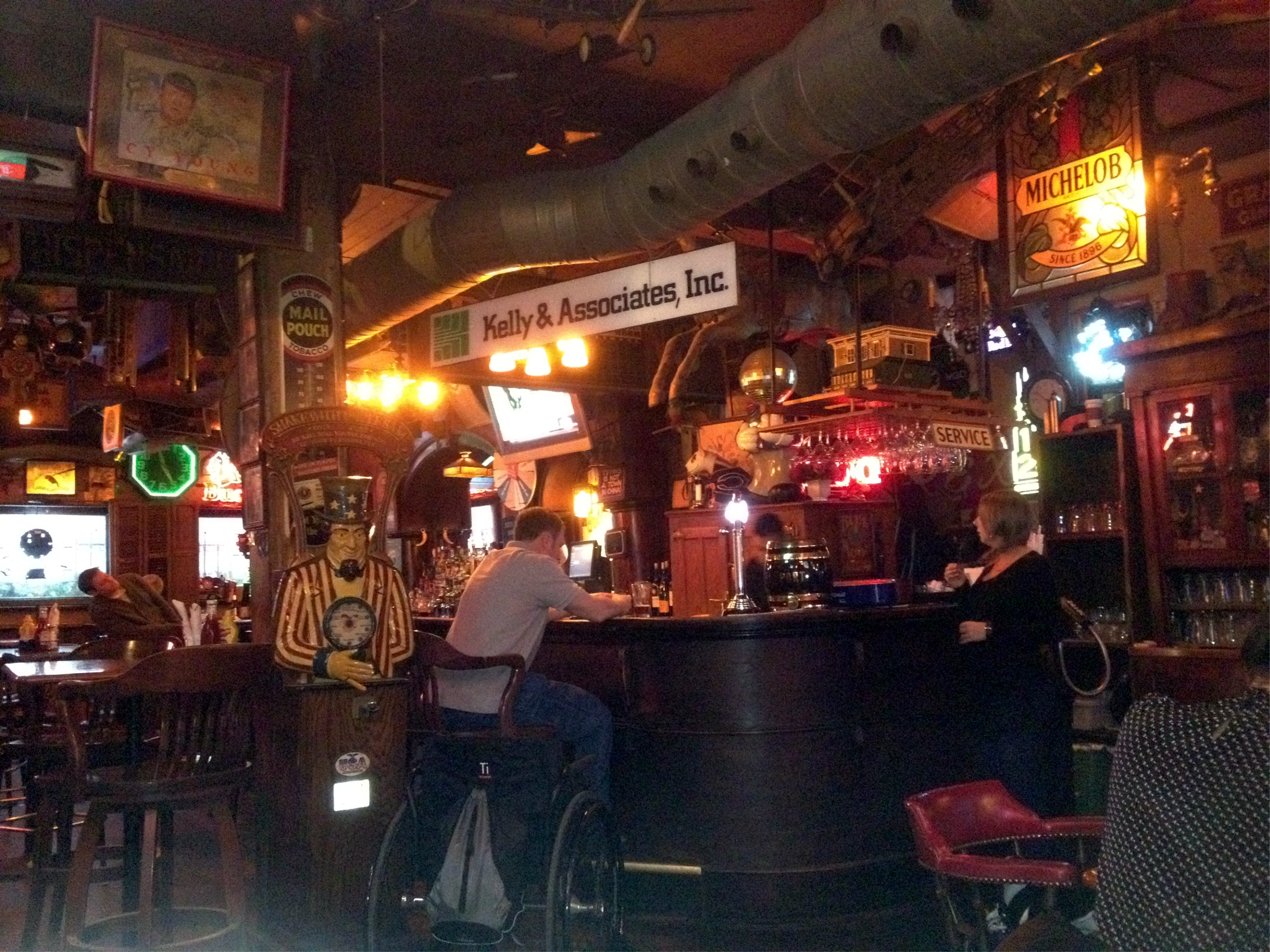
The interior of the bar in 2012

The building, at 678 N. Orleans St. (700N, 300W), Chicago, Illinois, United States, was erected in 1872 by James McCole, just one year after the Great Chicago Fire. It has a wooden frame, a building technique outlawed in the Central Business District by an ordinance passed by Chicago City Council shortly afterwards. The original tenant was Lawrence P. Elk, who used the ground floor as a grocery store and lived upstairs. It was converted to a dining establishment, the Huron-Orleans Restaurant, run by Vito Giacomoni, in 1921. His sons Jack and Nello ran it as a speakeasy during the prohibition.

In the 1930s, the bar acquired the nickname "The Green Door", and this was eventually adopted formally.

George Parenti purchased the bar from the Giacomoni brothers in August 1985.

The structure developed a lean from plumb in its early years, due to the construction techniques used at the time, and this is still noticeable.

In January 2015, a small, speakeasy-like space opened in the basement known as "The Drifter." A rotating cocktail list is featured on tarot cards.
