= GreenRiver =

Defunct U.S. restaurant and cocktail bar

Restaurant information
- Established: 2015
- Closed: 2018
- Location: Chicago, Illinois

GreenRiver was an American restaurant and cocktail bar located in the Streeterville neighborhood of Chicago, Illinois. It was a collaborative effort between Danny Meyer's Union Square Hospitality Group and hospitality group Best Bar in the World. The partnership also produced a smaller bar, Annex. The restaurant highlighted the Irish experience in Chicago, with cocktails named for famous Irish citizens, including Mary Harris Jones and Edward O'Hare. It opened in September 2015 on the 18th floor of 259 East Erie Street.

GreenRiver received a Michelin Star in the 2017 Guide and retained it for the 2018 Guide. It closed after service on January 24, 2018.

== See also ==
- List of Michelin-starred restaurants in Chicago
