= Frontier (restaurant) =

Coordinates: 41.90128°N 87.66346°W

- Interactive map of Frontier

Restaurant information
- Established: February 10, 2011
- Owner: Pioneer Tavern Group
- Head chef: Brian Jupiter
- Location: 1072 N. Milwaukee Ave., Chicago, Illinois, 60642, United States

Frontier is a restaurant in West Town, Chicago, Illinois, United States. It adopts a cosy setting and serves finger food as well as novelty food, such as cooked alligator meat. Frontier is run by chef Brian Jupiter and owned by Mark Domitrovich.

== Description ==
Frontier is located at Noble Square in West Town, Chicago. It is run by chef Brian Jupiter, who hails from New Orleans, Louisiana. Frontier is owned by Mark Domitrovich. The restaurant adopts a cosy setting.

=== Menu ===
Frontier offers an array of finger food and novelty food. It serves alligator on its menu. One alligator dish comprises a smoked whole alligator filled with whole chickens and other side items, and costs some few hundred dollars. Alligator ribs are also available. The restaurant also carries other smoked meat dishes, including pig and wild boar. After cooking, the whole animal dish is brought to a designated table to be divided into smaller pieces. Alcoholic drinks and oyster dishes are sold at Frontier too.
