= Temporis =

Defunct restaurant in Chicago, Illinois, U.S.

- Interactive map of Temporis

Restaurant information
- Established: January 2017
- Closed: 2024
- Food type: Contemporary
- Rating: (Michelin Guide)
- Location: 933 N. Ashland Ave., Chicago, Illinois, 60622, United States
- Coordinates: 41°53′56″N 87°40′1.5″W
- Website: www.temporischicago.com

Temporis was a fine-dining restaurant in Chicago, Illinois. It opened in January 2017 and received its first Michelin star in the 2019 guide. A fire closed the restaurant in 2024, and it did not reopen.

== See also ==
- List of Michelin-starred restaurants in Chicago
