= Topolobampo (restaurant) =

Mexican restaurant in Chicago, Illinois, U.S.

- Interactive map of Topolobampo

Restaurant information
- Established: 1989
- Food type: Mexican
- Rating: (Michelin Guide)
- Location: 445 N. Clark St., Chicago, Illinois, 60654, United States
- Coordinates: 41°53′26.2″N 87°37′51.3″W

Topolobampo is a Mexican restaurant in Chicago, Illinois. Chef and television personality Rick Bayless and Deann Bayless opened Topolobampo in 1989. It won the James Beard Foundation Award for Outstanding Restaurant in 2017. Topolobampo holds one Michelin star.

== See also ==
- List of Mexican restaurants
- List of Michelin-starred restaurants in Chicago
