= White Palace Grill =

Restaurant in Chicago, Illinois, U.S.

- Interactive map of White Palace Grill

Restaurant information
- Established: 1939
- Location: Chicago, Illinois, United States
- Coordinates: 41.8675°N 87.6390°W
- Website: whitepalacegrill.com

White Palace Grill is a restaurant in Chicago, Illinois, United States. Established in 1939, the business operates 24 hours a day. It is located on South Canal Street and has a diverse clientele. Among menu options are bacon, pancakes, pies, and ribs.

== See also ==
- List of Diners, Drive-Ins and Dives episodes
