= Roister =

Defunct restaurant in Chicago, Illinois, U.S.

- Interactive map of Roister

Restaurant information
- Established: 2016
- Closed: 2024
- Food type: American
- Location: 951 W. Fulton Market, Chicago, Illinois, 60607, United States
- Coordinates: 41°53′12″N 87°39′7″W

Roister was a restaurant in Chicago, in the U.S. state of Illinois. It served American cuisine.

== History ==
The Alinea Group opened Roister in March 2016 as its fourth Chicago venue, with Andrew Brochu as opening chef. The restaurant held a Michelin star from 2016 through 2019.

Roister closed after service on November 16, 2024. The Alinea Group replaced it at the Fulton Market site with Fire.

== See also ==
- List of Michelin-starred restaurants in Chicago
