= Galit (restaurant) =

Restaurant in Chicago, Illinois, U.S.

- Interactive map of Galit

Restaurant information
- Food type: Middle Eastern
- Location: 2429 North Lincoln Avenue, Chicago, Illinois, 60614, United States
- Coordinates: 41°55′34.5″N 87°38′58.5″W
- Website: galitrestaurant.com

Galit is a Middle Eastern restaurant in Chicago, Illinois. It opened in Lincoln Park in April 2019, with Zach Engel as chef and Andres Clavero as general manager. Galit received its first Michelin star in 2022 and was listed among the guide's one-star restaurants in 2025.

== See also ==
- List of Michelin-starred restaurants in Chicago
- List of Middle Eastern restaurants
