= Elske =

Restaurant in Chicago, Illinois, U.S.

- Interactive map of Elske

Restaurant information
- Food type: New American; Scandinavian
- Location: 1350 W. Randolph Ave., Chicago, Illinois, 60607, United States
- Coordinates: 41°53′4″N 87°39′39″W

Elske is a Danish-inspired restaurant in the West Loop of Chicago, Illinois, United States. It was opened in December 2016 by chefs David and Anna Posey. The restaurant received a Michelin star for the guide's 2018 Chicago selection, announced in October 2017.

In 2017, Bon Appétit ranked Elske No. 2 in its list of the best new restaurants in America.

== See also ==
- List of Michelin-starred restaurants in Chicago
- List of New American restaurants
- List of Scandinavian restaurants
