= Entente (restaurant) =

Defunct restaurant in Chicago, Illinois, U.S.

- Interactive map of Entente

Restaurant information
- Established: 2016
- Closed: 2021
- Location: 700 N. Sedgwick Street, Chicago, Illinois, 60654, United States

Entente was a restaurant in Chicago, Illinois. It opened in Lakeview in 2016 and received one Michelin star for the 2018 guide. In March 2019, it moved to 700 N. Sedgwick Street in River North. It had remained largely closed since March 2020 when its permanent closure was reported in December 2021.

== See also ==
- List of defunct restaurants of the United States
- List of Michelin-starred restaurants in Chicago
