= Feld (restaurant) =

Restaurant in Chicago, Illinois, U.S.

- Interactive map of Feld

Restaurant information
- Location: 2018 W. Chicago Ave., Chicago, Illinois, United States
- Coordinates: 41.8961°N 87.67785°W
- Website: www.feldrestaurant.com

Feld is a Michelin-starred restaurant in Chicago, Illinois, United States. It opened in Chicago's West Town on June 28, 2024, under chef Jacob (Jake) Potashnick. After being Michelin-recommended in 2024, Feld received its first Michelin star and a Green Star in the 2025 Chicago guide. Potashnick won the 2026 James Beard Foundation Award for Best Chef: Great Lakes.

== See also ==
- List of Michelin-starred restaurants in Chicago
