= Band of Bohemia =

Defunct restaurant in Chicago, Illinois, U.S.

- Interactive map of Band of Bohemia

Restaurant information
- Established: 2015
- Closed: 2020
- Rating: 1 Michelin star
- Location: 4710 N. Ravenswood Ave., Chicago, Illinois, 60640, United States
- Coordinates: 41°58′3″N 87°40′30″W

Band of Bohemia was a Michelin-starred culinary brewpub in Chicago, Illinois. Co-owned by Craig Sindelar and Michael Carroll, it opened in late 2015 at 4710 North Ravenswood Avenue. It received a Michelin star for the 2017 guide. The brewpub temporarily closed in 2020 after former workers alleged that Carroll and Sindelar fostered a toxic workplace and mishandled operations during the COVID-19 pandemic; the owners denied many of the allegations. It did not reopen after the owners filed for bankruptcy that October.

== See also ==
- List of defunct restaurants of the United States
- List of Michelin-starred restaurants in Chicago
