= EL Ideas =

Restaurant in Chicago, Illinois, U.S.

- Interactive map of EL Ideas

Restaurant information
- Owner: Phillip Foss
- Chef: Phillip Foss
- Food type: Contemporary, Creative
- Rating: (Michelin Guide)
- Location: 2419 West 14th Street, Chicago, Illinois, 60608, United States
- Coordinates: 41°51′46.4″N 87°41′12.7″W

EL Ideas is a restaurant in Chicago, Illinois, United States. It was opened in 2011 by chef and owner Phillip Foss. The restaurant received its first Michelin star in the 2014 Chicago guide.

== See also ==
- List of Michelin-starred restaurants in Chicago
