= Schaller's Original Pump =

Bar and restaurant in Illinois, United States

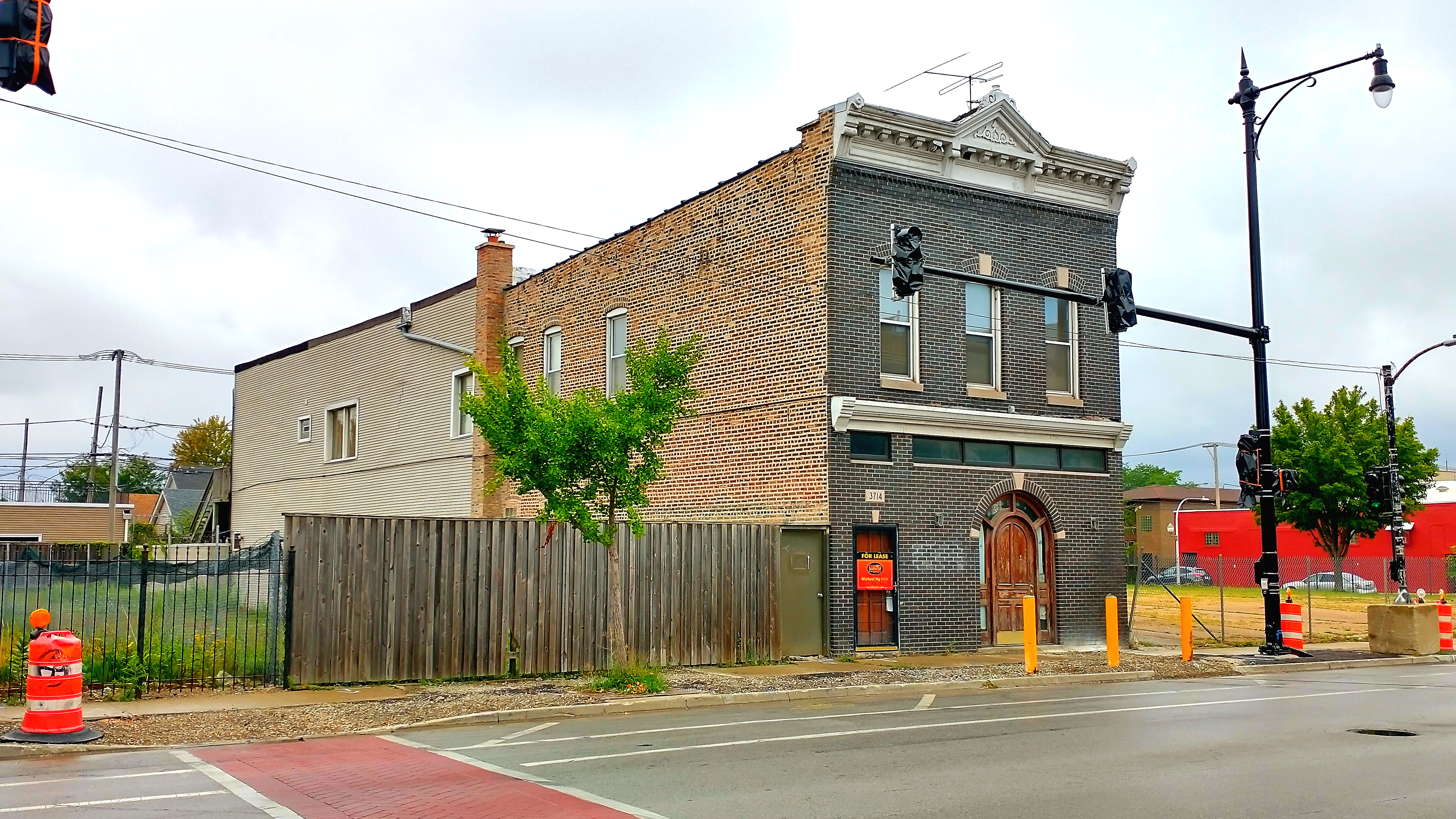
- The restaurant's exterior in September 2022, after closing in 2017
- Interactive map of Schaller's Original Pump

Restaurant information
- Established: 1881
- Closed: April 30, 2017
- Owner: Jack Schaller
- Previous owner: Harvey Schaller
- Food type: American
- Location: 3714 South Halsted Street, Chicago, Cook County, Illinois, 60609, United States
- Coordinates: 41°49′38″N 87°38′46″W

Schaller's Original Pump was the oldest bar and restaurant in Chicago, Illinois. Located at 3714 South Halsted Street, the Pump was opened in 1881 by George “Harvey” Schaller and was owned and operated by the founder's descendants until its closure in 2017. It was a local landmark in the Chicago South Side neighborhood of Bridgeport.

== History ==
Harvey Schaller emigrated from Germany and moved to the South Side neighborhood of Bridgeport in 1881, at a time when Bridgeport's chief industry was meat slaughtering. Schaller opened his pub at the intersection of 37th and Halsted Streets, in the then mostly German Hamburg section of Bridgeport, just a few blocks from the Union Stockyards. For decades, Schaller's served lunch to crowds of Stockyard workers.

Some resources indicate that Schaller's “Pump” designation dates back to Prohibition, when the two-story brick building housed a speakeasy, and beer was allegedly pumped in from a brewery next door (the Ambrosia Brewing Co.) directly to the beer taps at Schaller's, enabling its bartenders to reduce on-hand inventory. Schaller's still has a working peephole from Prohibition times on one of its old doors. Others believe that the “Pump” designation dates back to the Union Stockyard days, when patrons would bring their horses to a watering trough located in front of Schaller's—which was filled with water from a pump.

The back dining room at Schaller's was used for a horse bookmaking operation until well into the 1960s.

Jack Schaller, a WWII veteran born in 1924, was the most recent longtime proprietor and grandson of the founder. He lived upstairs from the establishment from 1978 until his death in 2016. After Jack died in 2016, Schaller's Pump permanently closed on 30 April 2017.

Across the street from Schaller's is the 11th Ward Democratic headquarters, which made Schaller's the unofficial headquarters for Bridgeport's legacy of Chicago mayors, including Edward Joseph Kelly (1933–47), Martin H. Kennelly (1947–55), Richard J. Daley (1955–76), Michael Anthony Bilandic (1976–79), and Richard M. Daley (1989–2011).

== In popular culture ==
Scenes from the 1948 movie Call Northside 777, starring James Stewart, were filmed inside and across the street from Schaller's.
