= Atelier (Chicago restaurant) =

Restaurant in Chicago, Illinois, U.S.

- Interactive map of Atelier

Restaurant information
- Closed: May 2026
- Head chef: Bradyn Kawcak
- Food type: American
- Rating: (Michelin Guide)
- Location: 4544 N. Western Ave., Chicago, Illinois, 60625, United States
- Coordinates: 41°58′10″N 87°41′19″W
- Website: www.atelier-chicago.com

Atelier was a restaurant in Chicago, Illinois, United States. It served American cuisine. It opened in 2023 at 4835 N. Western Avenue under executive chef Christian Hunter and received a Michelin star that year. Bradyn Kawcak became executive chef in 2024. The restaurant relocated to 4544 N. Western Avenue in October 2025 and closed in May 2026 after struggling to sustain operations.

== See also ==
- List of Michelin-starred restaurants in Chicago
