= Cariño (restaurant) =

Mexican restaurant in Chicago, Illinois, U.S.

- Interactive map of Cariño

Restaurant information
- Owners: Norman Fenton and Karen Young
- Head chef: Norman Fenton
- Food type: Mexican
- Rating: (Michelin Guide)
- Location: 4662 N. Broadway, Chicago, Illinois, 60640, United States
- Coordinates: 41°58′1.0″N 87°39′31.5″W
- Website: carinochicago.com

Cariño is a Michelin-starred Mexican restaurant in Chicago, Illinois, United States.

== History ==
Cariño opened on December 28, 2023, at 4662 N. Broadway in Chicago's Uptown neighborhood, in the former Brass Heart space. Executive chef Norman Fenton and co-owner Karen Young developed the restaurant after working together at Wild in Tulum, Mexico. Michelin awarded Cariño one star in its 2024 Chicago selection, and it retained one star in the 2025 selection.

== See also ==
- List of Mexican restaurants
- List of Michelin-starred restaurants in Chicago
