= Grace (restaurant) =

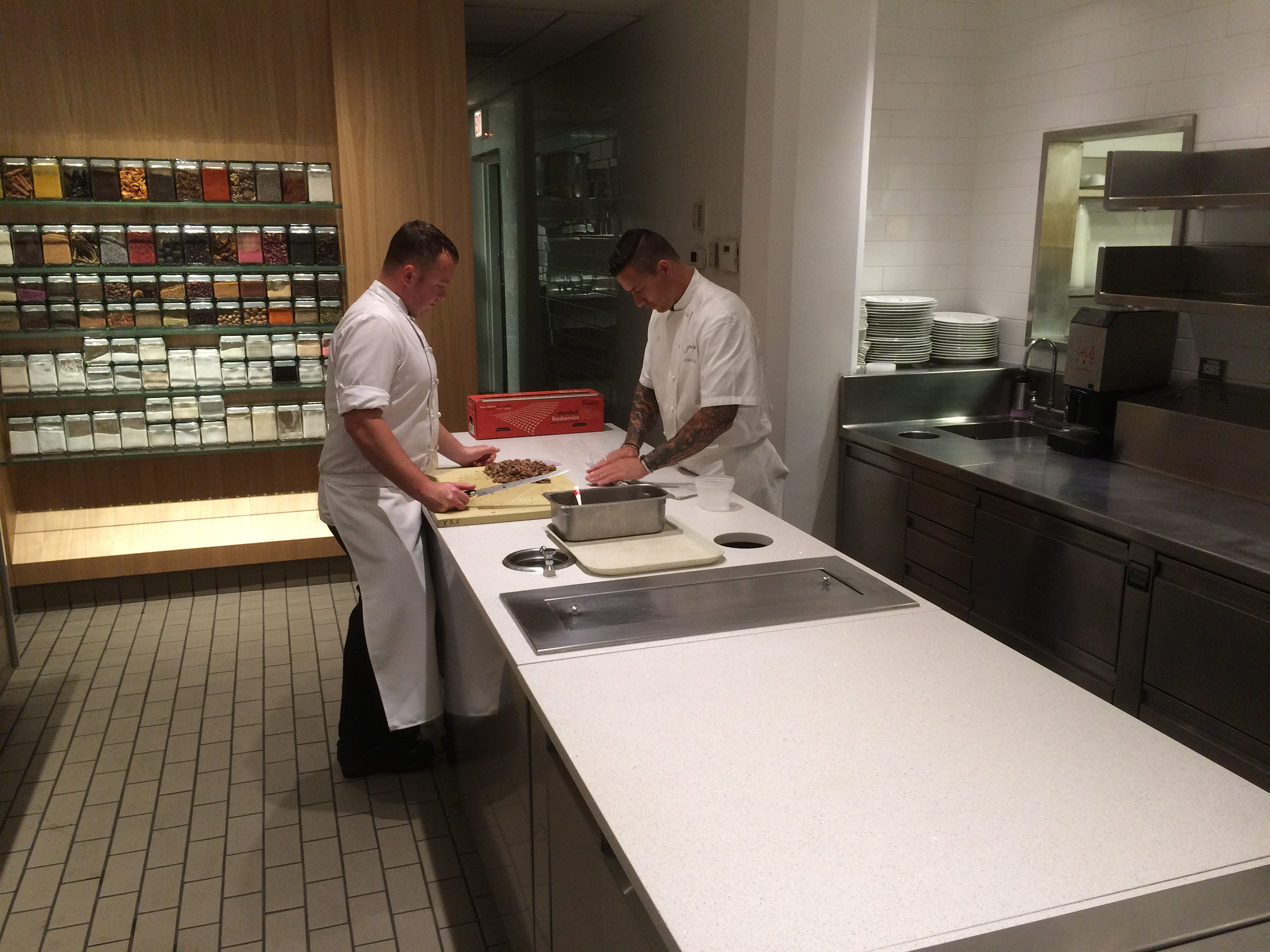
- Grace's kitchen in 2016.
- Interactive map of Grace

Restaurant information
- Established: December 11, 2012
- Closed: December 20, 2017
- Owner: Michael Olszewski
- Head chef: before its closure: Curtis Duffy
- Food type: Progressive
- Rating: (Michelin Guide)
- Location: 652 W Randolph St, Chicago, Illinois, 60661, United States
- Coordinates: 41°53′5.4″N 87°38′41.6″W
- Reservations: Required

Grace was a restaurant in the West Loop neighborhood in Chicago, Illinois, United States. It had been ranked 3 stars by the Michelin Guide each year since 2015. Before closing on December 20, 2017, Alinea and Grace were the only Chicago restaurants with three Michelin stars.

== History ==
Original head chef Curtis Duffy and his business partner Michael Muser opened Grace in December 2012. Duffy had previously worked at Charlie Trotter’s and was chef de cuisine at Alinea when it opened in 2004. In the years prior to opening Grace, he maintained a two star Michelin rating while the head chef at Avenues in the Peninsula Hotel until closing the restaurant in 2011.

Grace has maintained a Michelin Guide three-star restaurant status since 2014 and to date is only the third restaurant in Chicago ever to earn three Michelin stars after Alinea and the since-shuttered L2O.

In the 2015 documentary For Grace, Curtis Duffy and his life journey to the creation of Grace are featured; originally from Ohio, as a teenager Duffy overcame his father's murder of his mother and subsequent suicide.

As of late 2016, Grace edged out Alinea as Chicago's most expensive restaurant and one of the most costly in the United States.

In December 2017, Duffy and Muser abruptly left Grace after its investor and owner Michael Olszewski rejected their offer to buy the restaurant. Shortly afterwards, Olszewski closed the restaurant. In July 2020, Duffy and Muser opened a new restaurant in Chicago called Ever.

== Awards and honors ==
- Michelin Guide, 3-Star Rating
- Five Diamond Award, AAA
- Forbes Travel Guide, 5-Star Rating
- Robb Report, Best of the Best 2013: Dining
- Chicago Tribune, 4-Star Rating
- Chicago Magazine, Best New Restaurant
- Best Chef: Great Lakes 2016 (Curtis Duffy) James Beard Foundation

== See also ==
- List of Michelin-starred restaurants
- List of Michelin-starred restaurants in Chicago
