= Esmé (restaurant) =

Restaurant in Chicago, Illinois, U.S.

- Interactive map of Esmé

Restaurant information
- Head chef: Jenner Tomaska
- Dress code: None
- Rating: (Michelin Guide)
- Location: 2200 North Clark Street, Chicago, Illinois, 60614, United States
- Coordinates: 41°55′19.5″N 87°38′19.5″W
- Website: esmechicago.com

Esmé is a restaurant in Chicago, in the U.S. state of Illinois. Jenner Tomaska and Katrina Bravo opened it in Lincoln Park in August 2021; its tasting-menu format incorporates collaborations with Chicago artists. Esmé received its first Michelin star in the 2022 Chicago guide and was listed among the guide's one-star restaurants in 2025.

== See also ==
- List of Michelin-starred restaurants in Chicago
