= Chicago (magazine) =

American monthly magazine

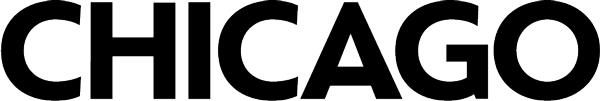

- Cover of March 2019 edition
- Editor: Susanna Homan
- Former editors: Beth Fenner
- Frequency: Monthly
- Circulation: 98,306 (2024)
- Founded: 1952 (as WFMT Guide)
- First issue: 1970 (as Chicago)
- Company: Tribune Publishing
- Language: English
- Website: www.chicagotribune.com/chicago-magazine/
- ISSN: 0362-4595
- OCLC: 2398937

Chicago, originally published as WFMT Guide in 1952, is a monthly magazine published by Tribune Publishing. It concentrates on lifestyle and human interest stories, and on reviewing restaurants, travel, fashion, and theatre from or nearby Chicago. Its circulation in 2004 was 165,000, larger than People in its market. Also in 2004, it received the National Magazine Award for General Excellence. It is a member of the City and Regional Magazine Association (CRMA).

== History ==
In the second half of the 20th century, several magazines bore the name Chicago magazine. The current one also has the longest history. It was established in 1952 as the monthly WFMT Guide and was founded as the programming guide for the classical radio station WFMT.

Starting in October 1970, the WFMT Guide began accepting paid advertising.

The WFMT Guide changed its name to Chicago Guide with the December 1970 issue and became a full-sized magazine.

Two other magazines titled Chicago magazine existed between the 1950s and the 1970s. One, published by founding editor Maurice English, published from 1954 until 1957 or 1958. The other version was a quarterly magazine that was published by the New Chicago Foundation from 1964 until 1973 and had Richard P. Frisbie as its editor, from 1971 until 1973. (Starting in late 1973, the formerly New Chicago Foundation-published Chicago magazine changed its name to the Chicagoan, and was published by the husband-and-wife duo of Jon Anderson and Abra Prentice Wilkin, had Richard Christiansen as its editor for a time, and hit the newsstands with its new name and format in September 1973. The Chicagoan was sold to National Textbook Company and S. William Pattis in the spring of 1974 and Pattis turned around and sold the Chicagoan to the Chicago Guide in September 1974. The circulation of the two magazines was combined with the November 1974 issue of the Chicago Guide.)

Chicago Guide magazine was renamed Chicago magazine at the start of 1975.)

In 1981, Chicago introduced the Nelson Algren Award, a short story contest that the magazine later abandoned before it was picked up by the Chicago Tribune newspaper.

In December 1986, Chicago Educational Television Association, which had owned WFMT and WTTW, announced that it would sell the magazine for $17 million to a joint venture formed by Metropolitan Detroit Magazine and Adams Communications. The deal closed in January 1987. Landmark Communications bought the magazine in 1990. Primedia (now Rent Group) bought the magazine in 1995. Tribune bought the magazine from Primedia in 2002.

Chicago magazine celebrated its 50th anniversary in 2020.

== Staff ==
Chicago magazine's first editor was Allen Kelson, who previously had been named editor-in-chief of WFMT Guide in 1968. Kelson later became editor-in-chief, and then publisher.

In 1984, Don Gold, the former managing editor of Playboy magazine, became the magazine's editorial director, in a new position created between editor-in-chief Allen Kelson and editor John Fink.

From 1986 until 1991, Hillel Levin served as the magazine's editor. He left in early 1991 to join other investors in buying a Miami-based and Caribbean media group. Levin was succeeded by Richard Babcock, who up to that point had been assistant managing editor of Rupert Murdoch's New York magazine.

In April 2009, the magazine laid off longtime literary editor Christine Newman.

In December 2009, it was announced that longtime Chicago restaurant critic Dennis Ray Wheaton would be leaving his position and that Jeff Ruby would replace him.

In April 2011, Richard Babcock stepped down as Chicago's editor after exactly 20 years in the job. In August 2011, the magazine named Beth Fenner to replace Babcock.

In December 2011, Chicago magazine's managing editor, Shane Tritsch, resigned after 18 years with the magazine after he was passed over for the top editorial post there.

In 2012, longtime Chicago magazine senior writer Marcia Froelke Coburn left Chicago magazine to join Time Out Chicago as a contributing writer.

Also in 2012, longtime Chicago magazine senior editor Nora O'Donnell left the magazine to join Playboy magazine in southern California as senior editor and research chief.

In March 2014, Chicago magazine's No. 2 editor, Cassie Walker Burke, left the magazine to join Crain's Chicago Business as an assistant managing editor.

In November 2015, Chicago magazine's award-winning features editor, David Bernstein, took a buyout and left the company.

In March 2016, the magazine's editor, Beth Fenner, was fired after more than four years, and the magazine's publisher, Tom Conradi, also was removed from his post. In their places, Susanna Homan was named editor and publisher.

In October 2017, the magazine's longtime dining editor, Penny Pollack, retired.
