= Oxalis (restaurant) =

Defunct restaurant in New York City

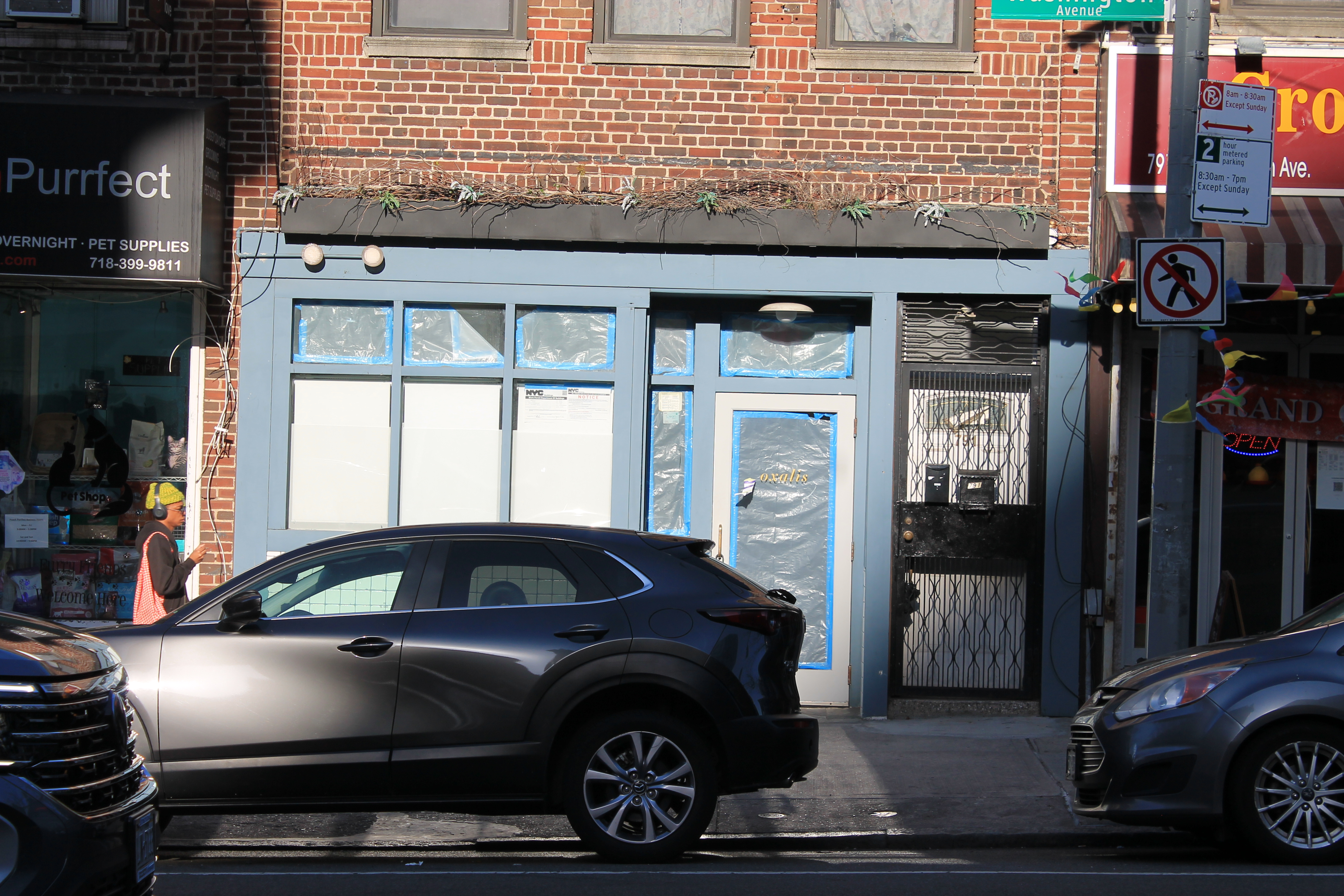
- Oxalis's former storefront seen in April 2024.
- Interactive map of Oxalis

Restaurant information
- Established: 2018
- Closed: 2023
- Food type: New American
- Location: 791 Washington Avenue, Brooklyn, New York, 11238
- Coordinates: 40°40′22.5″N 73°57′45.5″W

Oxalis was a New American restaurant in New York City. The fine dining restaurant had received a Michelin star.

The restaurant closed at the end of 2023.

== See also ==
- List of Michelin-starred restaurants in New York City
- List of New American restaurants
