= Atoma (restaurant) =

Restaurant in Seattle, Washington, U.S.

- Interactive map of Atoma

Restaurant information
- Owners: Johnny and Sarah Courtney
- Chef: Johnny Courtney
- Food type: American; New American
- Location: Seattle, King, Washington, United States
- Coordinates: 47.6613°N 122.3401°W

Atoma is a restaurant in Seattle's Wallingford neighborhood, in the U.S. state of Washington. It is co-owned by spouses Johnny (who is also chef) and Sarah Courtney. The restaurant opened in November 2023 and serves American / New American cuisine.

== Reception ==
The New York Times included the rosette cookie with farmer's cheese and Walla Walla onion jam in a list of 23 of the "best American dishes" of 2023. Atoma was named Restaurant of the Year by Seattle Metropolitan. Eater included the business in its 2024 list of the fourteen best new restaurants in the United States. Atoma also won in the Best New Restaurant category of Eater Seattle's annual Eater Awards in 2024.

== See also ==
- List of New American restaurants
