= Oddfellows Cafe and Bar =

Restaurant in Seattle, Washington, U.S.

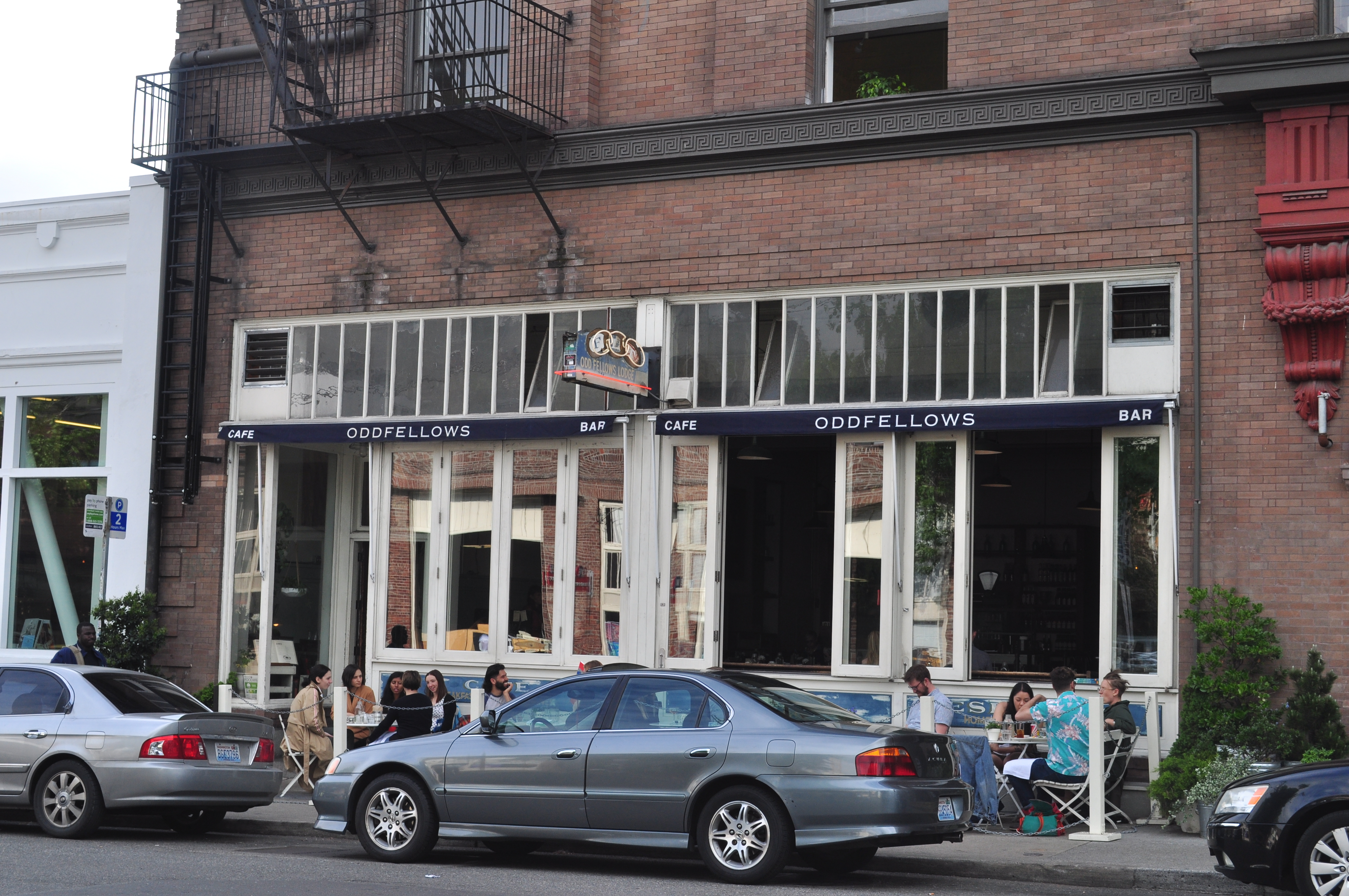
- The restaurant's exterior, 2018
- Interactive map of Oddfellows Cafe and Bar

Restaurant information
- Food type: American; New American
- Location: 1525 10th Avenue, Seattle, Washington, 98122, United States
- Coordinates: 47°36′53.5″N 122°19′10.5″W
- Website: oddfellowscafe.com

Oddfellows Cafe and Bar is a restaurant in Seattle's Capitol Hill neighborhood, in the United States.

== Description ==
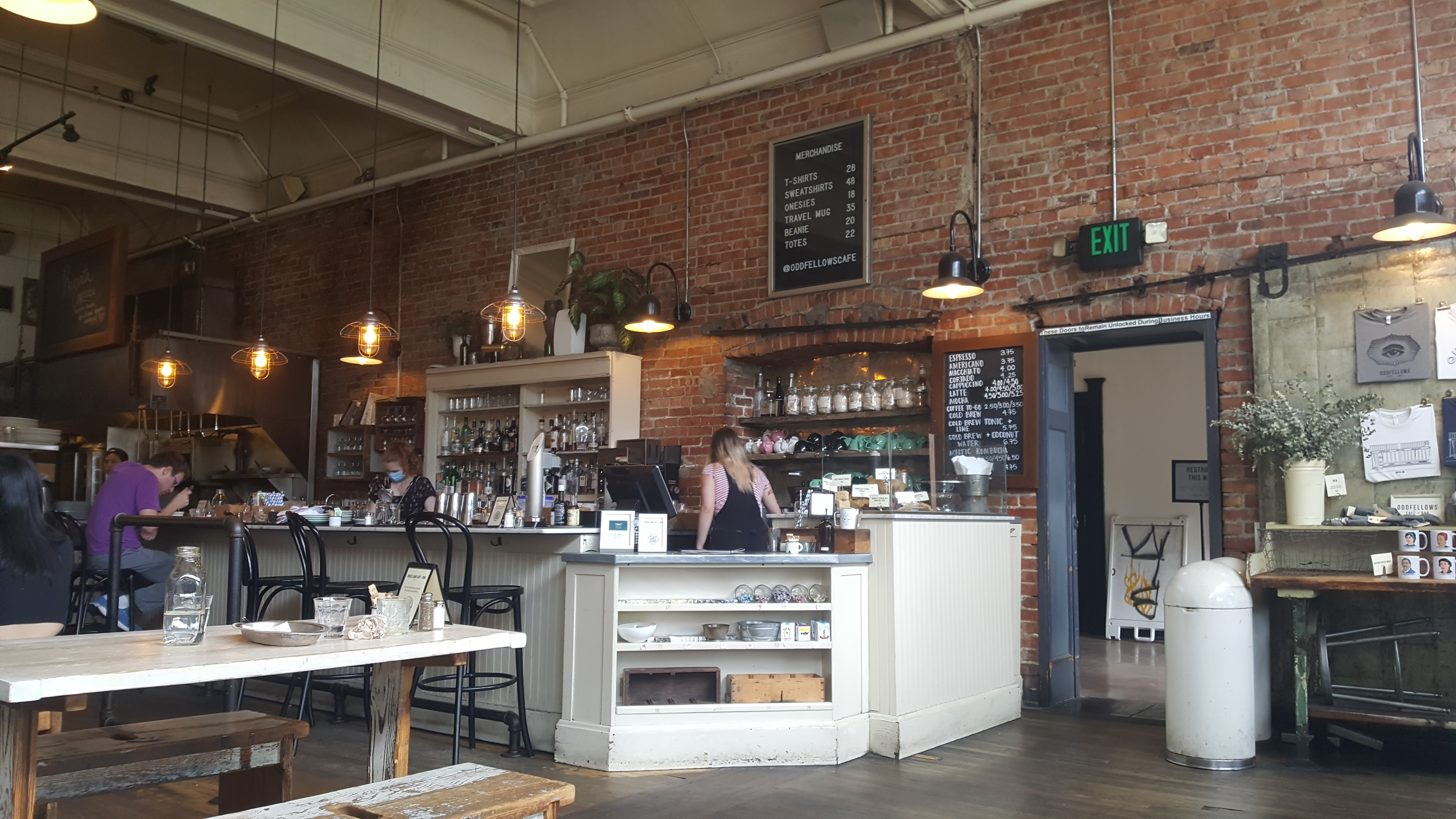
Interior, July 2022

The American/New American restaurant serves breakfast, lunch and dinner; the menu has included biscuits, French toast, pastries, paninis, salads and soups. The Oddball sandwich has marinara meatballs, provolone, Parmesan, and roasted chicken. Fodor's says, "Service is sometimes a bit lacking, but the huge communal-style seating, Capitol Hill–hipster-chic vibe, cold brews, and festive music make this a fun place to watch the day go by or spend an evening out."

The restaurant also serves coffee during the day and cocktails and wine at night. Conde Naste Traveler has described the interior as "airy" and "white-washed".

== History ==
Owner Linda Derschang opened the restaurant in 2008. Oddfellows has participated in Seattle Restaurant Week. During the COVID-19 pandemic, Oddfellows built a street patio. Bella Pham, Benjamin Hubbard, and Stacy Milrany painted murals on plywood on the restaurant's exterior during the pandemic.

Little Oddfellows, located within the adjacent Elliott Bay Book Company, has been described as the restaurant's "sister cafe".

== Reception ==
Leonardo David Raymundo included the restaurant in Eater Seattle's 2017 overview of "Low-Stakes First Date Spots in Seattle". He wrote, "With big, open windows facing the east and a collection of vintage antiques littered about like a 1930s garage sale, Linda Derschang’s Oddfellows is a contemporary homage to the past. All the egg dishes here are legit, but the signature classic is baked eggs with ham and cheese." Emma Banks included Oddfellows in Thrillist's 2022 list of "The Best Patios for Eating and Drinking Outside in Seattle".

== See also ==
- List of New American restaurants
