= Coopers Hall Winery and Taproom =

Urban winery and restaurant in Portland, Oregon, U.S.

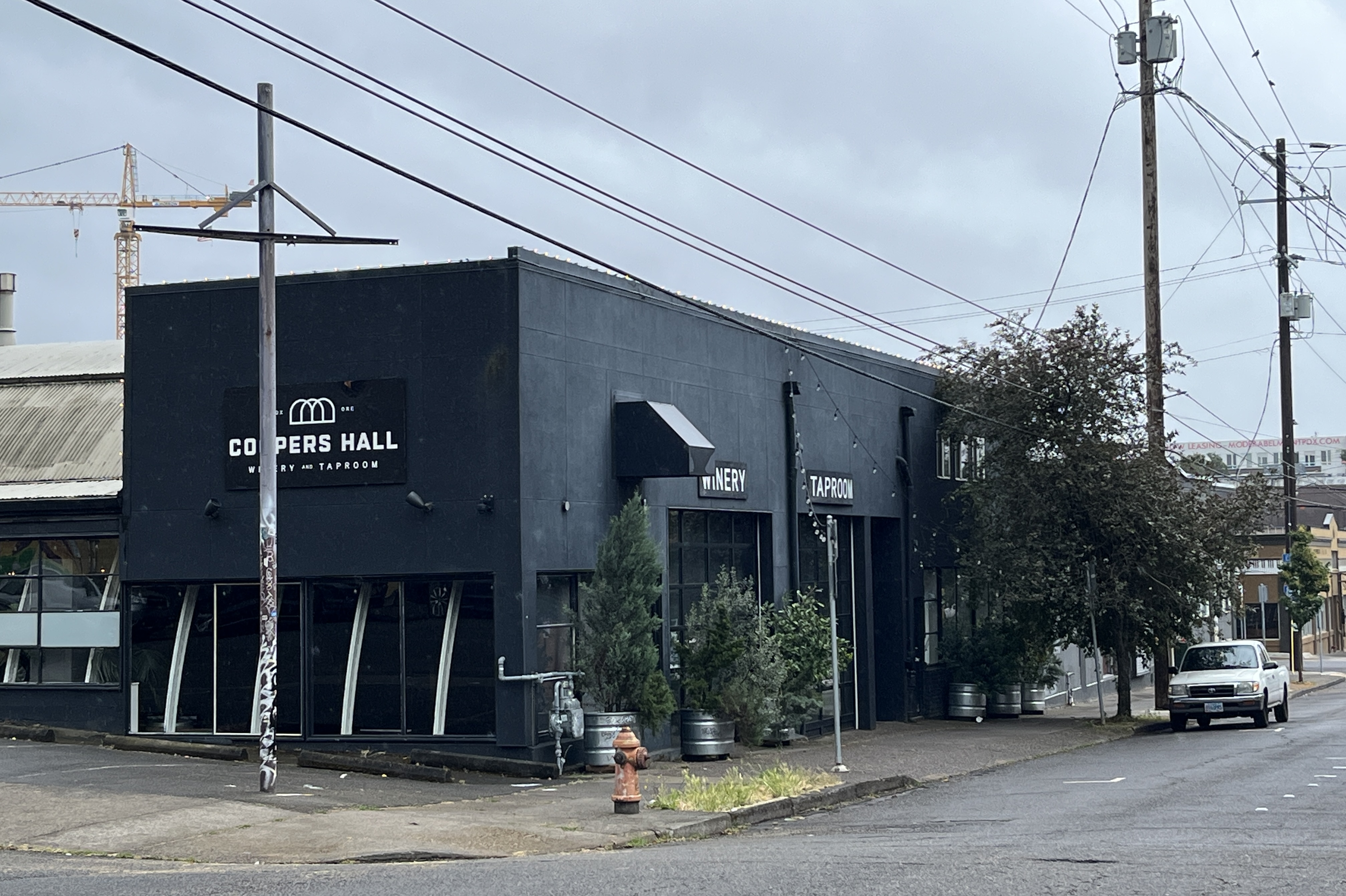
- Exterior, 2025
- Interactive map of Coopers Hall Winery and Taproom

Restaurant information
- Established: 2014
- Food type: New American
- Location: 404 Southeast 6th Avenue, Portland, Multnomah, Oregon, 97214
- Coordinates: 45.5198°N 122.6596°W
- Website: coopershall.com

Coopers Hall Winery and Taproom, or simply Coopers Hall, is an urban winery and restaurant in Portland, Oregon, United States.

== Description ==
Eater Portland's Mattie John Bamman has described Coopers Hall as a "massive, warehouse-chic urban winery and taproom".

== History ==
Coopers Hall opened in 2014. The winery hosted an event befitting the Ovarian Cancer Alliance of Oregon and SW Washington on Saint Catherine's Day in 2014, featuring prominent women from the local food and beverage industries, live music, and food. Coopers Hall hosted the closing party for Chefs Week in 2015.

The restaurant debuted a happy hour menu in 2016, featuring burgers, hors d'oeuvres, beers, cocktails, and wines. Coopers Hall had stopped using drinking straws by 2018. In 2019, the winery began offering three Willamette Valley wines (Cascadia White, Pinot Noir, and Rose of Pinot Noir) in refillable bottles as part of a collaborative project with BottleDrop and the Oregon Beverage Recycling Cooperative.

In 2020, during the COVID-19 pandemic, Coopers Hall hosted 'Coopers Hall-iday Market' in November featuring 25 local vendors, and offered patio service on New Year's Eve. Nicholas Restaurant began using Coopers Hall wine in 2021.

== Reception ==
In Eater Portland's 2019 list of "Portland's Unreal Wine Bars", Alex Frane and Brooke Jackson-Glidden wrote, "Often used as a wedding venue, this lofty and bright urban winery has an underrated food menu, with everything from dandelion caesars to foraged-mushroom-laden pastas. Cooper's Hall's wines come from a massive wall of taps, a more sustainable alternative to the typical collection of bottles that also allows for easy tastings."

== See also ==
- List of New American restaurants
