= Aviary (restaurant) =

Defunct restaurant in Portland, Oregon, US

- Interactive map of Aviary

Restaurant information
- Established: 2011
- Closed: 2020
- Food type: New American; French; Asian
- Location: 1733 NE Alberta Street, Portland, Oregon, 97211, United States
- Coordinates: 45°33′33.7″N 122°38′49.9″W

Aviary was a restaurant on Alberta Street in northeast Portland, Oregon's Vernon neighborhood, in the United States. Sarah Pliner was a co-owner and head chef.

== Description ==
Aviary operated on Alberta Street in northeast Portland's Vernon neighborhood. The New American and French bistro had an Asian influence and focused on small plates. According to Oregon Public Broadcasting, the restaurant "mixed French technique with East Asian elements". Menu options included a Banh Mi burger, duck liver toasts, lobster rolls, octopus, pig ears, beer and cocktails. Eater Portland described Aviary as "chic".

== History ==
Sarah Pliner, Kat Whitehead, and Jasper Shen opened the restaurant on February 1, 2011. In July, a fire forced the business to close temporarily for five months. Aviary re-opened on December 6.

Molly Harbarger included Aviary in The Oregonian's 2016 list of Portland's most expensive restaurants.

The restaurant closed in 2020, during the COVID-19 pandemic, and was replaced by Gumba.

== Reception ==
In 2012, Aviary was named Restaurant of the Year by Willamette Week. Fodor's said, "Eschewing many culinary conventions, this visionary Alberta Street eatery serves up innovative dishes that sometimes push boundaries but consistently succeed in flavor and execution. The simple menu of small plates (order two to three per person) is influenced by Asian flavors and uses European cooking techniques, combining unusual ingredients that offer pleasing contrasts in flavor and texture." The restaurant earned Sarah Pliner a James Beard Foundation Award nomination in the Best Chef: Northwest category.

Michael Russell included the restaurant in The Oregonian's 2017 list of the 40 best restaurants in northeast Portland and 2018 list of the city's 40 best restaurants. In 2018, he recommended Aviary "[b]ecause from the shrimp toast with lemon anchovy aioli to the hoisin-glazed beef short rib with turnip cake, the menu at Sarah Pliner's creative Northeast Portland restaurant looks as intriguing as it is indulgent".

== See also ==
- List of French restaurants
- List of New American restaurants
