= Mischa (restaurant) =

Restaurant in New York City

- Interactive map of Mischa

Restaurant information
- Established: April 17, 2023
- Closed: March 2024
- Food type: American; New American
- Location: 153 East 53rd Street, New York City, New York, 10022, United States
- Coordinates: 40°45′29″N 73°58′13″W

Mischa was an American / New American restaurant in New York City. The restaurant was located adjacent to the mezzanine of the food hall in the Citigroup Center.

== Reception ==
The New York Times included Mischa in a 2023 list of the city's twelve best new restaurants. Time Out New York rated the restaurant two out of five stars.

== See also ==
- List of defunct restaurants of the United States
- List of New American restaurants
