= List of New American restaurants =

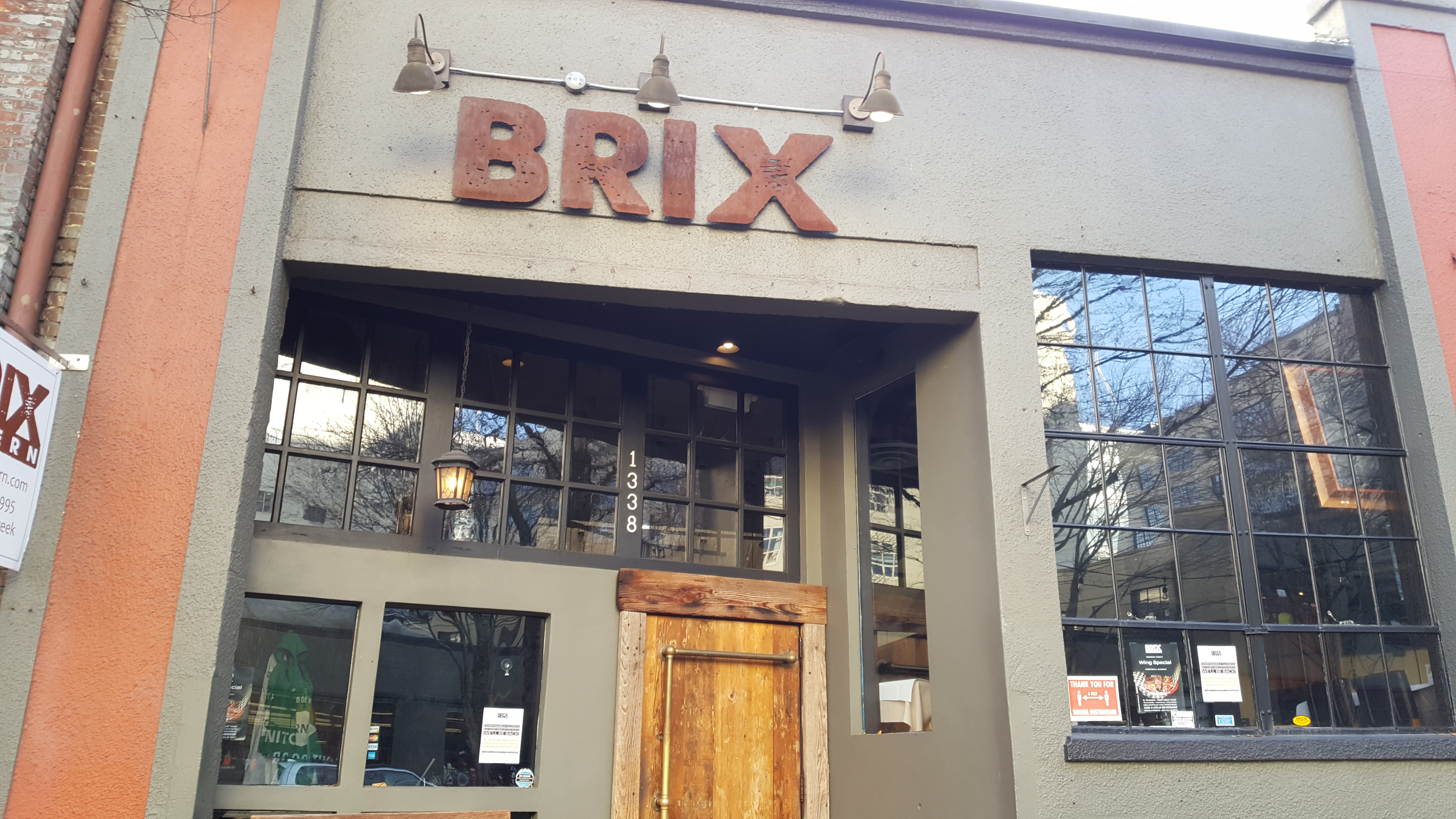
Brix Tavern, Portland, Oregon

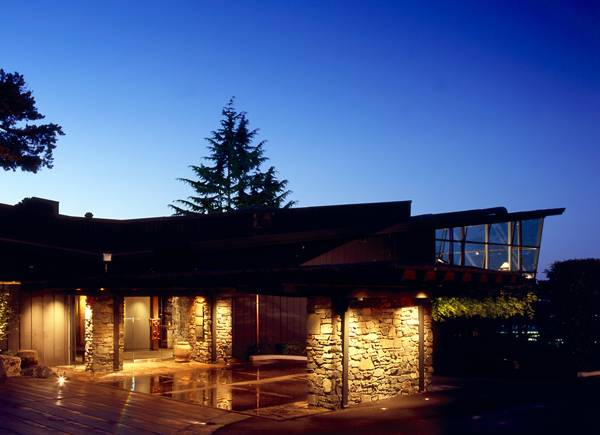
Canlis, Seattle, Washington

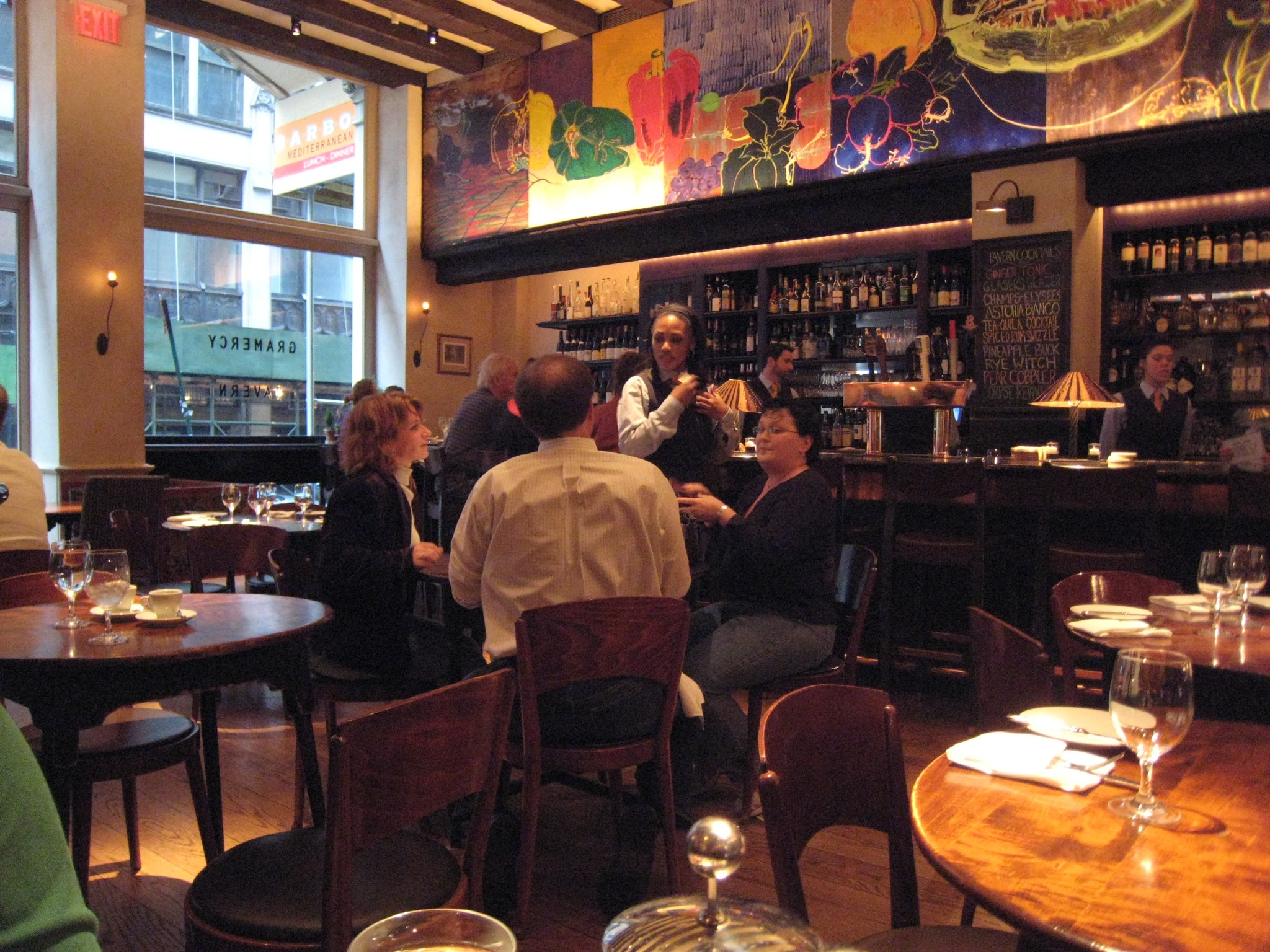
Gramercy Tavern, New York City

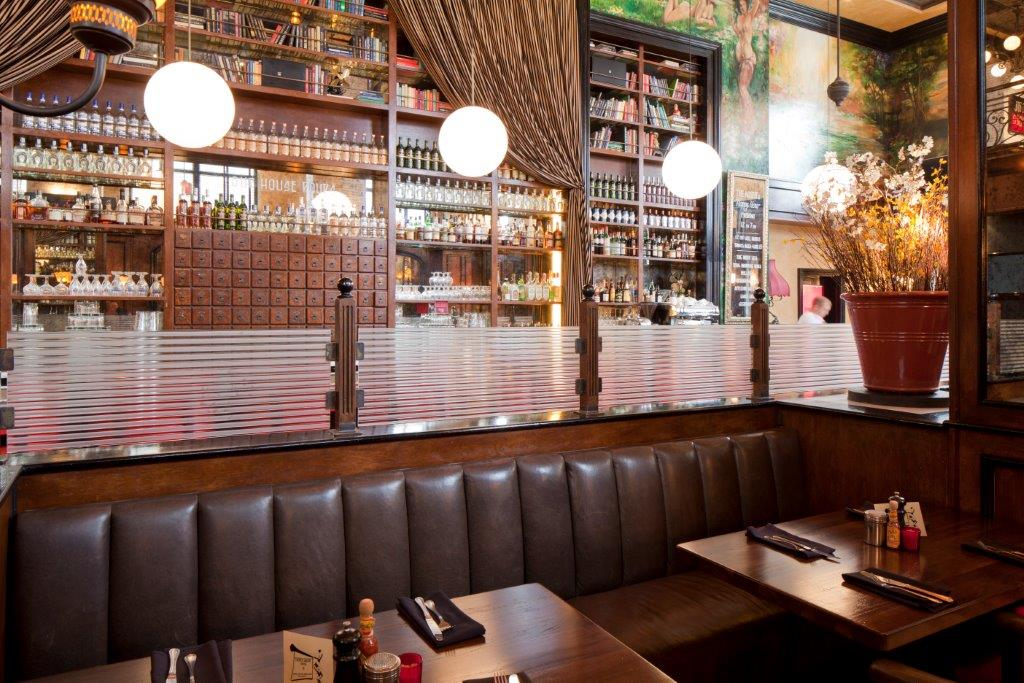
The Misfit, Santa Monica, California

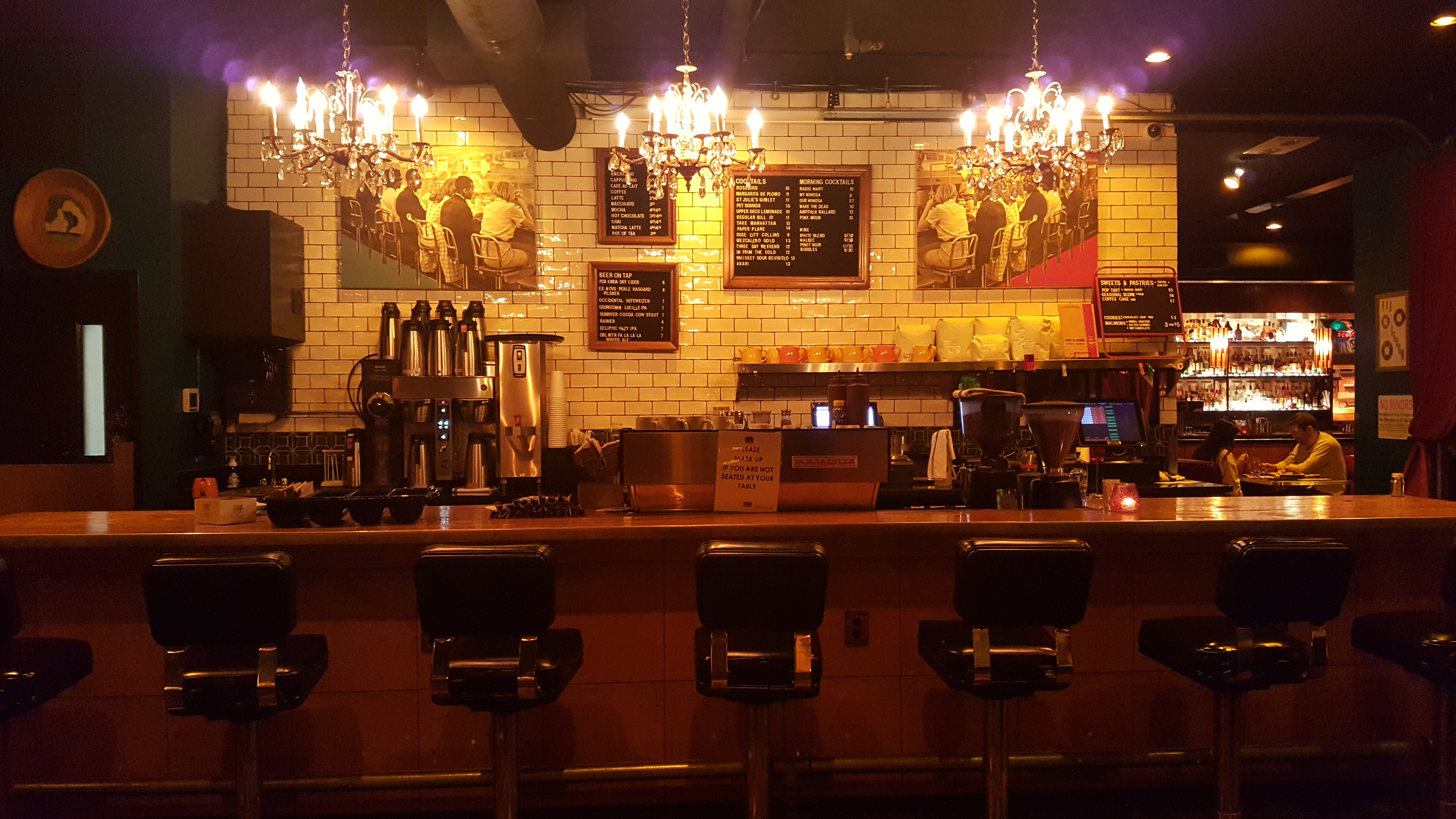
Radar, Portland, Oregon

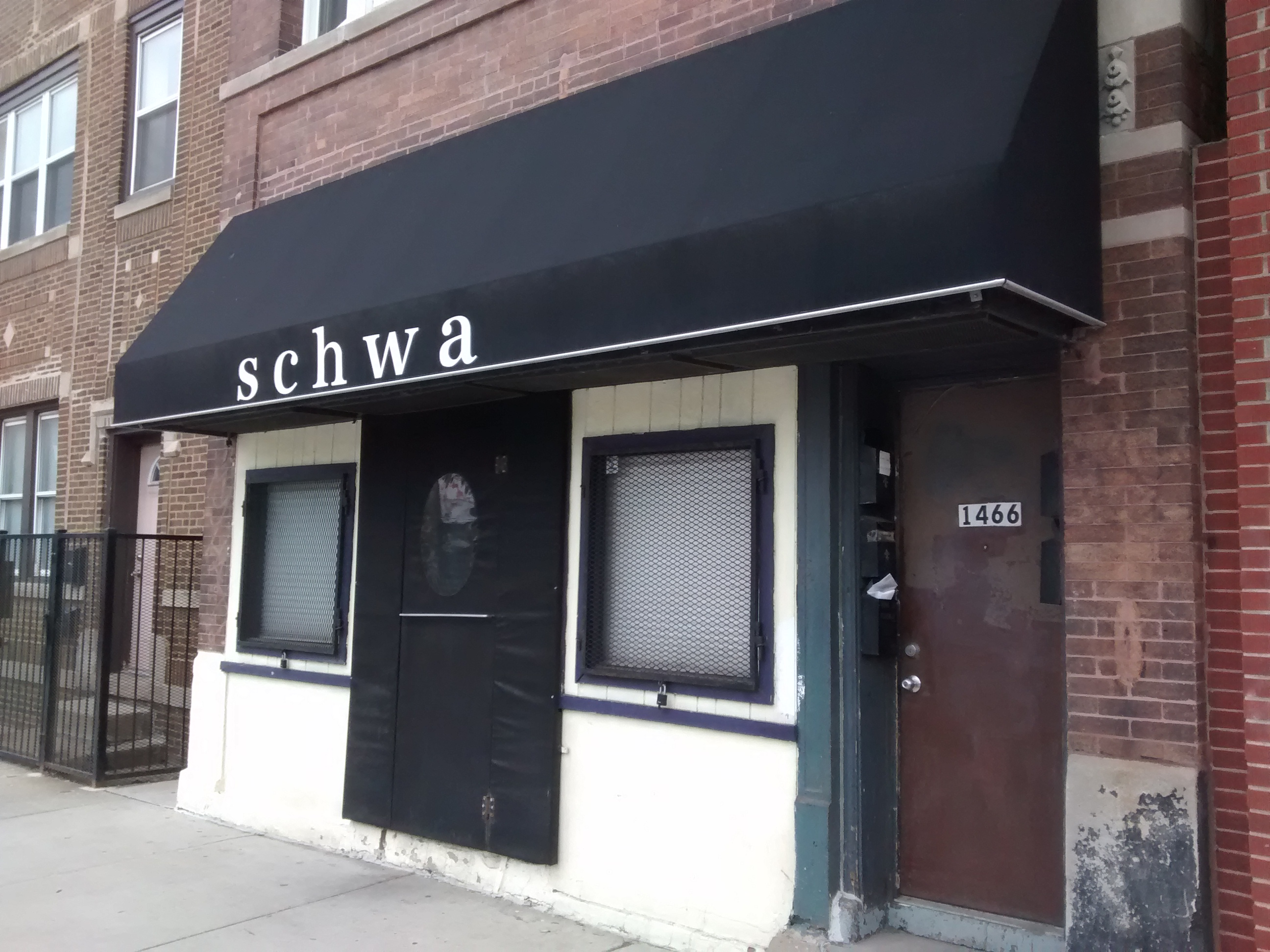
Schwa, Chicago, Illinois

Following is a list of notable New American restaurants:

- 7 Adams
- Acadia, Chicago, Illinois
- Al's Place, San Francisco, California
- Alberta Street Pub, Portland, Oregon
- Asiate, New York City
- Atoma, Seattle
- Aureole, New York City
- Avery, San Francisco
- Aviary, Portland, Oregon
- Bar Chelou, Pasadena, California, U.S. (closed 2025)
- Benu, San Francisco
- Betony, New York City
- BluWater Bistro, Seattle metropolitan area
- Boka, Chicago
- Boulevard, San Francisco
- Brix Tavern, Portland, Oregon
- Buddakan
- Canlis, Seattle, Washington
- The Carlile Room, Seattle
- Carlyle Restaurant, New York City
- Chace's Pancake Corral, Bellevue, Washington
- The Chastain, Atlanta, Georgia
- Church and Union
- Coastal Kitchen, Seattle
- The Compound, Santa Fe, New Mexico
- Coopers Hall Winery and Taproom, Portland, Oregon
- Copine, Seattle
- Crofton on Wells, Chicago
- Delilah, Las Vegas (within Wynn Las Vegas), Los Angeles, and Miami
- DJT
- Dockside Saloon and Restaurant, Portland, Oregon
- Elements, Princeton, New Jersey, U.S.
- Elske, Chicago
- Fat's Chicken and Waffles, Seattle
- Four Seasons Restaurant, New York City
- G-Love, Portland, Oregon
- Goldfinch Tavern, Seattle
- Gotham Bar and Grill, New York City
- Gramercy Tavern, New York City
- Greenlake Bar and Grill, Seattle
- Hattie's Hat, Seattle
- Harvest Moon Cafe
- Jory Restaurant, Newberg, Oregon
- King's Carriage House, New York City
- Kinkead's, Washington, D.C.
- La Toque, Napa, California
- Lark, Seattle
- Laurelhurst Market, Portland, Oregon
- Lazy Betty, Atlanta, Georgia
- Lazy Susan, Portland, Oregon
- The Lobby, Chicago
- Localis, Sacramento, California
- Lost Lake Cafe and Lounge, Seattle
- Mas, New York City
- Mike's Chili Parlor, Seattle
- Mischa, New York City
- The Misfit, Santa Monica, California
- Moody Tongue, Chicago
- Morchella, Portland, Oregon
- Nancy's Hustle, Houston, Texas
- Normandie
- Oddfellows Cafe and Bar, Seattle
- OK Omens, Portland, Oregon
- One If By Land, Two If By Sea, New York City
- Oriole, Chicago
- Oxalis, New York City
- Park Grill, Chicago
- Per Se, New York City
- Plumed Horse, Saratoga, California
- Poppy, Seattle
- Protégé, Palo Alto, California
- Quaintrelle, Portland, Oregon
- Quinn's Pub, Seattle
- Radar, Portland, Oregon
- Radio Room, Portland, Oregon
- Reverie, Washington, D.C.
- Roberta's, New York City
- Roost, Portland, Oregon
- Schwa, Chicago
- Sepia, Chicago
- Single Shot, Seattle
- Skillet, Seattle
- SkyCity, Seattle
- Sons & Daughters, San Francisco
- Spring
- Stars, San Francisco
- SuperBite, Portland, Oregon
- Swank and Swine, Portland, Oregon
- Take Root, New York City
- Tasty n Daughters, Portland, Oregon
- Tribeca Grill, New York City
- Union Square Cafe, New York City
- wd~50, New York City
- White Swan Public House, Seattle
- Wildwood, Portland, Oregon
- Woodberry Kitchen, Baltimore, Maryland
- The Woodsman Tavern, Portland, Oregon
- Workshop Kitchen + Bar, Palm Springs, California
