= Avery (restaurant) =

Restaurant in San Francisco, California, U.S.

- Interactive map of Avery

Restaurant information
- Closed: November 4, 2023
- Food type: New American
- Location: 1552 Fillmore Street, San Francisco, California, 94115, United States
- Coordinates: 37°47′2.5″N 122°25′58″W

Avery was a restaurant in San Francisco, California. The restaurant served New American cuisine and had received a Michelin star. Avery closed in November 2023.

== See also ==
- List of defunct restaurants of the United States
- List of Michelin-starred restaurants in California
- List of New American restaurants
