= Crofton on Wells =

Defunct restaurant in Chicago, Illinois, U.S.

- Interactive map of Crofton on Wells

Restaurant information
- Established: 1997
- Closed: 2012
- Owner: Suzy Crofton
- Head chef: Suzy Crofton
- Food type: New American
- Location: 535 North Wells Street, Chicago, Illinois, 60610, United States
- Coordinates: 41°53′31″N 87°38′2″W

Crofton on Wells was chef Suzy Crofton's New American restaurant in Chicago, Illinois. It opened in 1997. It received one Michelin star in the inaugural 2011 Chicago Guide. It was not retained in the 2012 guide. It permanently closed in April 2012, after Crofton said business had become painfully slow and she intended to reconceive the restaurant more accessibly.

== See also ==
- List of defunct restaurants of the United States
- List of Michelin-starred restaurants in Chicago
- List of New American restaurants
