= Bar Chelou =

Restaurant in Pasadena, California, U.S.

Coordinates: 34°08′43″N 118°08′14″W

- Interactive map of Bar Chelou

Restaurant information
- Location: 37 South El Molino Avenue, Pasadena, California, 91101, United States

Bar Chelou was a French fusion and New American restaurant in Pasadena, California, United States. It was located on the grounds of the Pasadena Playhouse, in the Playhouse District. It closed in 2025 following the Eaton Fire; although the structure was undamaged, many patrons were displaced by the fire and business suffered accordingly.

== Reception ==
Bar Chelou was named one of the twelve best new restaurants in the United States by Eater in 2023. Time Out Los Angeles has rated the restaurant 4 out of 5 stars.

== See also ==
- List of New American restaurants
