= Mas (restaurant) =

Mas (farmhouse)
- Interactive map of Mas (farmhouse)

Restaurant information
- Established: 2004; 22 years ago
- Closed: June 30, 2018
- Chef: Galen Zamarra
- Food type: New American and French
- Location: 39 Downing Street (between Bedford Street and Varick Street), in the West Village in Manhattan, New York, New York, 10014, United States
- Coordinates: 40.729281°N 74.003866°W
- Seating capacity: 55
- Website: masfarmhouse.com

Mas (farmhouse) (pronounced as either "mah" or "mahs") was a New American and French restaurant located at 39 Downing Street (between Bedford Street and Varick Street) in the West Village in Manhattan, in New York City. It was established in 2004. Mas closed in 2018.

In old Provençal dialect, "mas" means a traditional stone farmhouse, and the restaurant used that as its theme.

== Menu ==
The menu was New American and French cuisine, and largely organic. It included items such as braised ribs, duck breast, organic hen, grilled Portuguese sardines, bigeye tuna, and wild nettle risotto.

The chef was Galen Zamarra, who trained in France and was the chef de cuisine at Bouley Bakery, and was named the 2001 "rising star chef of the year" by the James Beard Foundation.

== Restaurant ==
Mas had old wood beams, stone pillars, and a sandstone bar. The atmosphere was romantic and intimate. Diners' attire ranged from jeans and T-shirts to suits. The restaurant can seat 55 diners.

An early morning fire broke out at Mas in June 2016, forcing Zamarra to close for renovations. After undergoing extensive repairs, and after taking the time to renovate the dining area, Mas was reopened on July 1, 2017. However, Zamarra and business partner Eric Blinderman decided to close Mas after June 30, 2018 due to lack of long-term profitability.

== Reviews ==
In 2004, journalist Frank Bruni gave Mas one star, and wrote for The New York Times that it was: "an earnest, tasteful restaurant" that "nicely splits the difference between fussy and unfussy". In 2008, he gave it two stars.

In 2013, Zagat gave Mas a food rating of 28, and a decor rating of 25, rating it the eighth-best restaurant in New York City. The food rating was the second-highest for a New American restaurant in New York City, and the second-highest for a West Village restaurant.

== See also ==
- List of French restaurants
- List of New American restaurants
