= The Carlile Room =

New American restaurant in Seattle, Washington, U.S.

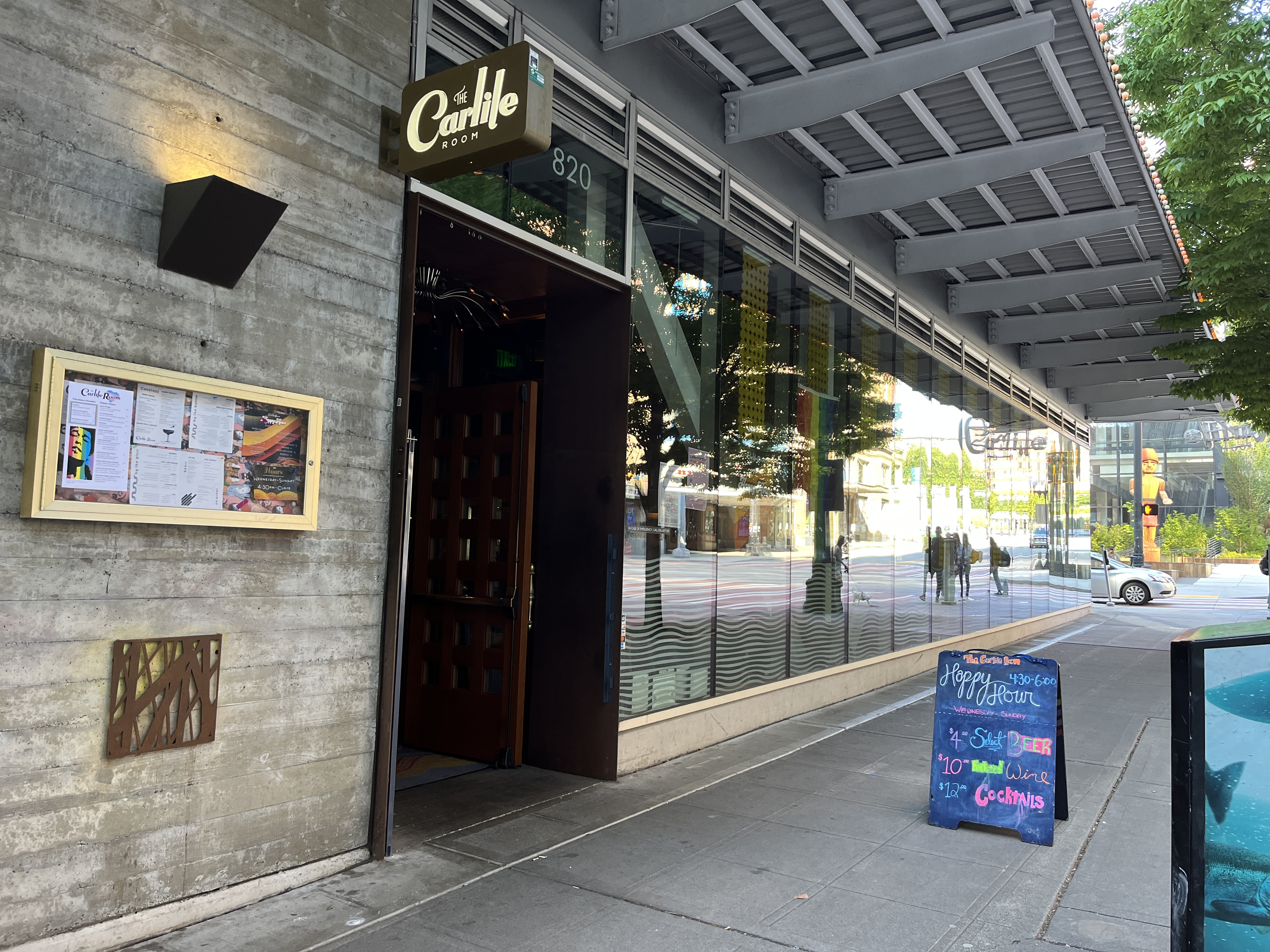
- The restaurant's exterior, 2023
- Interactive map of The Carlile Room

Restaurant information
- Established: July 2015
- Food type: New American
- Location: 820 Pine Street, Seattle, King County, Washington, 98101, United States
- Coordinates: 47°36′48.7″N 122°19′56.8″W
- Website: thecarlile.com

The Carlile Room is a New American restaurant in Seattle, in the U.S. state of Washington.

== Description ==
The Carlile Room is a bar and restaurant in Downtown Seattle, inspired by and named after American singer-songwriter Brandi Carlile. Thrillist has described the business as a "retro-themed" New American restaurant with an "eclectic" selection of small plates of meats and vegetables sourced locally, such as broccoli flowers, salmon, and venison leg. Seattle Metropolitan has described the establishment as a "high-spirited and casual spot across from the Paramount, where the menu exalts plants in genuinely game-changing ways". The menu has included bulgur, peach, pomegranate, and pistachio-stuffed eggplant, as well as chickpea-fava fritters with peach pickles, herb sprigs, and nuts.

== History ==
The restaurant opened in July 2015. In early 2016, Tom Douglas replaced tipping with automatic twenty percent service charges.

== Reception ==
Seattle Metropolitan has called Carlile "Tom Douglas's most creative concept yet" and said, "Fun booze, fun decor—fun, period." Donald Olson of Frommer's rated the restaurant two out of three stars. Providence Cicero of The Seattle Times rated Carlile three stars.

== See also ==
- List of New American restaurants
