= Greenlake Bar and Grill =

Restaurant in Seattle, Washington, U.S.

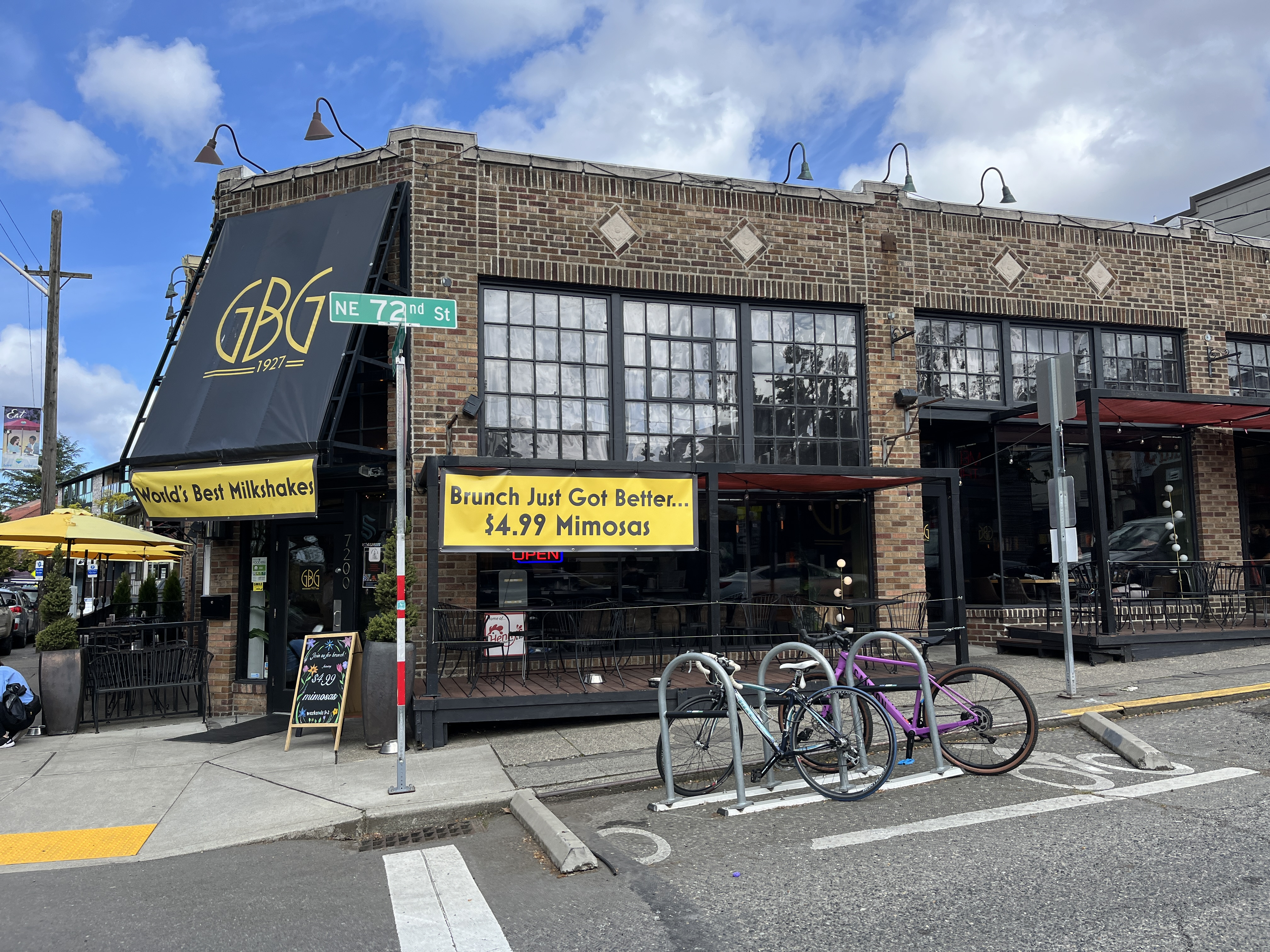
- The restaurant's exterior, 2024
- Interactive map of Greenlake Bar and Grill

Restaurant information
- Food type: American; New American
- Location: 7200 East Green Lake Drive N, Seattle, King, Washington, 98115, United States
- Coordinates: 47.6804°N 122.3257°W

Greenlake Bar and Grill (GBG) is a restaurant in Seattle, Washington. It serves American / New American cuisine from a historic 1927 commercial building in Green Lake.

The current operation is a second iteration of the restaurant; the first iteration of GBG closed in February 2018, after operating for 17 years. The second iteration of GBG launched in January 2020.

GBG has been temporarily closed since November 13, 2025, when a kitchen fire broke out overnight and spread to the ceiling of the building. Seattle Fire Department investigators ruled the fire accidental and likely caused by an electrical fault.

== Description ==
Greenlake Bar and Grill (GBG) serves American / New American cuisine in Seattle's Green Lake neighborhood. The restaurant operates in a 1927 commercial building that was originally owned by D. T. Young and has housed various businesses such as Dement's Candies and Nuts, Green Lake Grill (1979–1980s), and printing companies, as well as real estate agents.

According to the City of Seattle, which considers the building a historical site: "This brick commercial vernacular structure is in largely intact condition, with notable large 15-light transom windows over the main display windows. The restaurant entry is angled to take advantage of the corner siting. The dark red brick cladding, in varied shades, is accented with cast concrete coping and rose medallions at each bay. The three storefronts on 72nd Street are largely intact with wood-framed display windows. The main corner entry has been modernized."

GBG is family- and dog-friendly. The restaurant has a seating capacity of approximately 100 people, with an outdoor patio and seating area that can accommodate approximately 40 people. It has multiple televisions and has aired sports events. The happy hour menu has included a cheeseburger, a chicken-breast sandwich, a flourless chocolate cake, nachos, a quesadilla, and a spinach salad, as well as oyster shooters, beer, and wine.

== History ==
Owned by Neighborhood Grills, GBG opened as the company's first restaurant in October 2000. Eastlake Bar and Grill followed in November 2004, then Southlake Grill opened in February 2007. Lake Forrest Bar and Grill had opened by 2009 . The first iteration of GBG closed in February 2018, after operating for 17 years. Lunchbox Laboratory operated in the space for approximately two years, until January 2020. The second iteration of GBG was announced the same month, with a planned opening date of January 27. Like many restaurants, GBG operated via take-out at times during the COVID-19 pandemic.

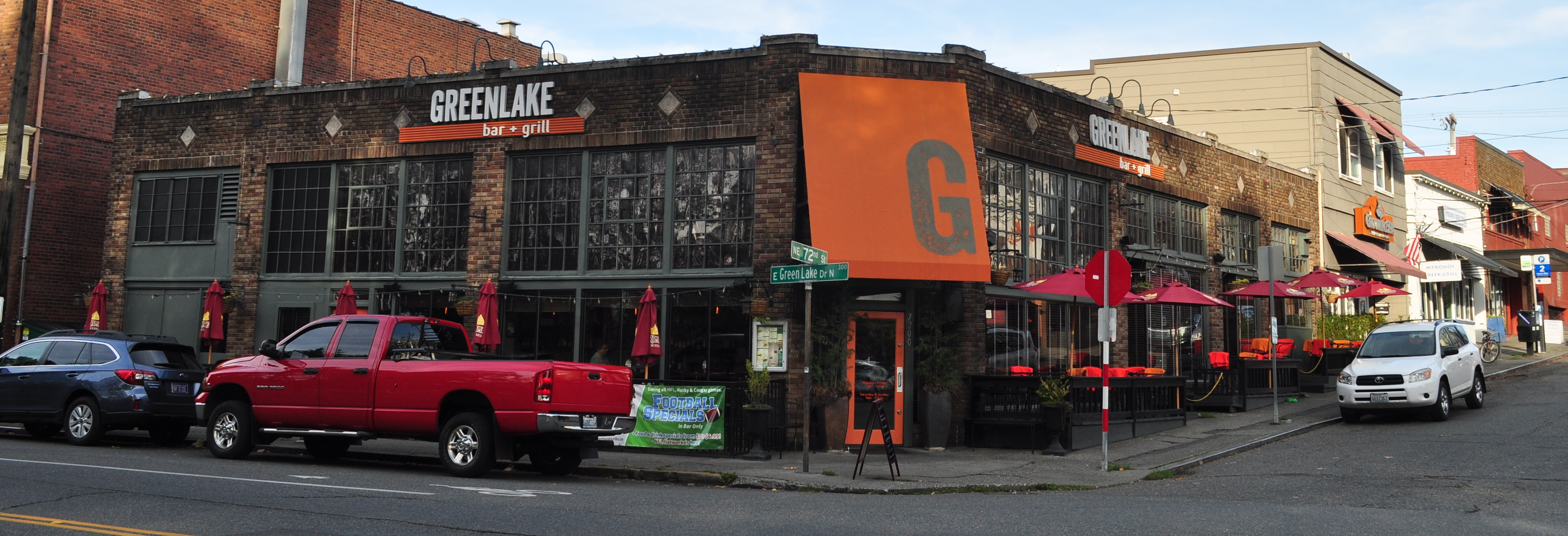
Exterior, 2015

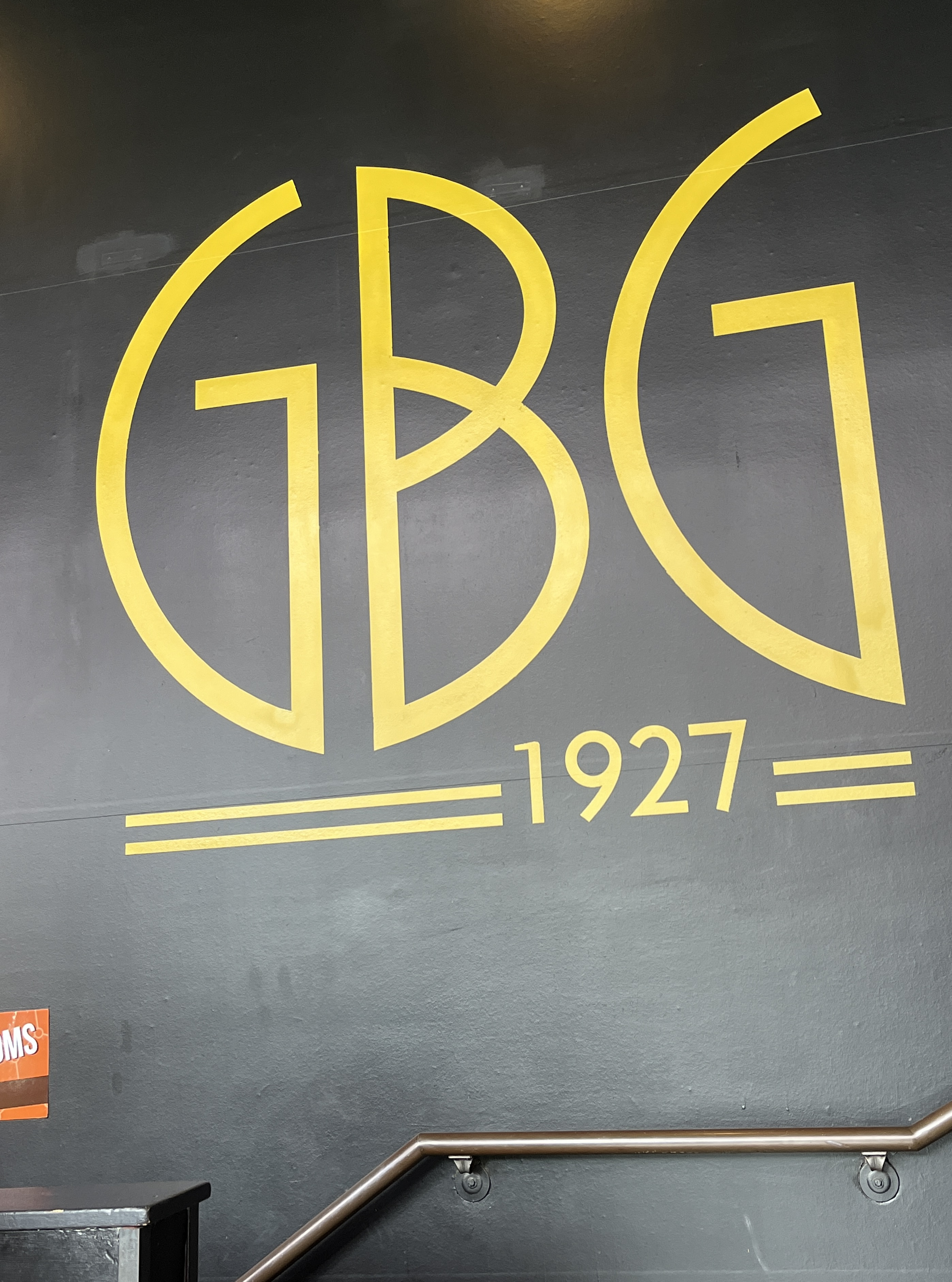
Interior wall, 2024

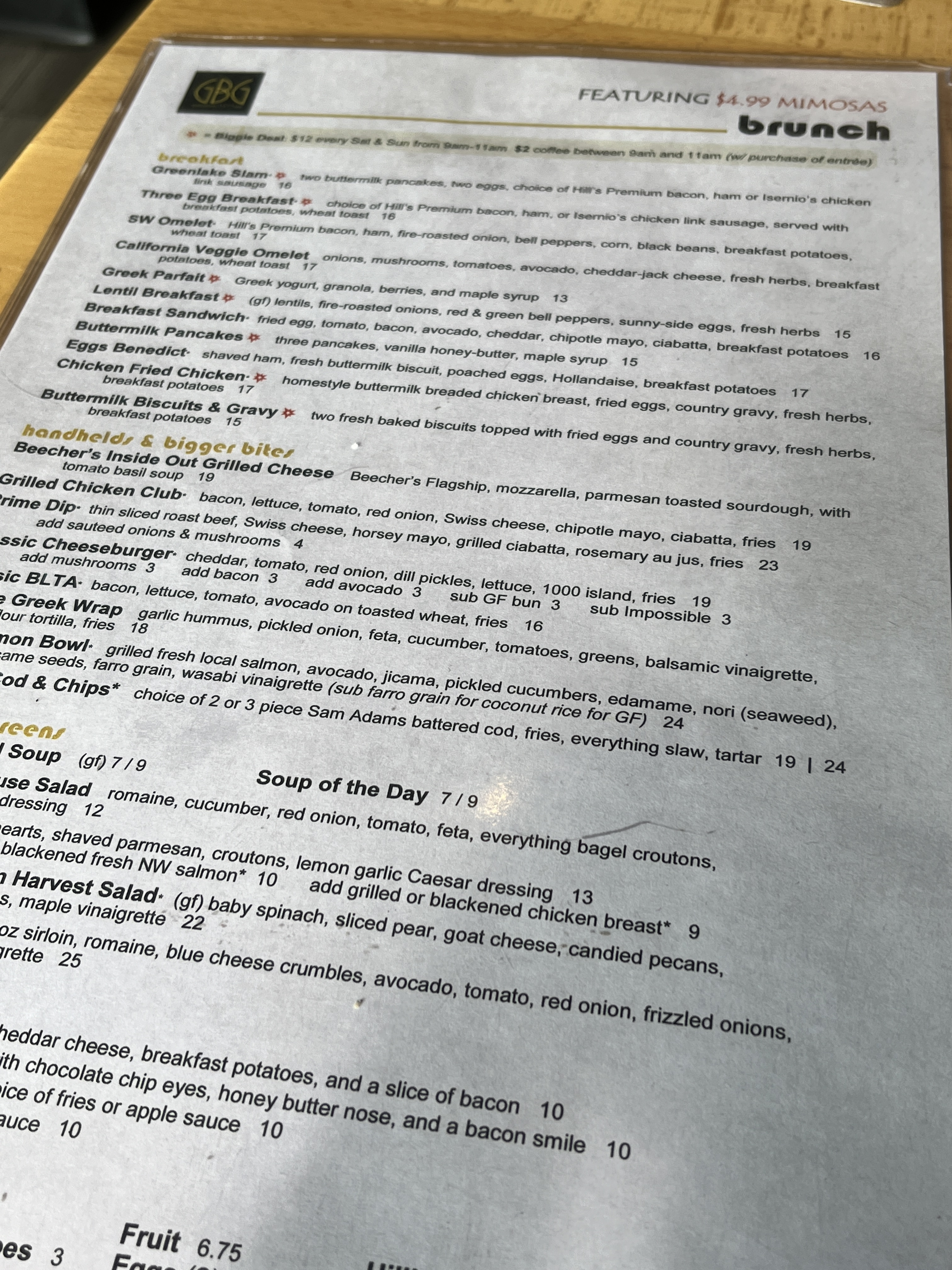
Food menu

== See also ==
- List of New American restaurants
