= 7 Adams =

Restaurant in San Francisco, California, U.S.

- Interactive map of 7 Adams

Restaurant information
- Head chef: David Fisher
- Food type: American; New American
- Rating: (Michelin Guide)
- Location: 1963 Sutter Street, San Francisco, California, 94115, United States
- Coordinates: 37°47′10″N 122°25′57″W
- Reservations: Required
- Website: www.7adamsrestaurant.com

7 Adams is an American / New American restaurant in San Francisco, California, United States. It has received a Michelin star.

== See also ==
- List of Michelin-starred restaurants in California
- List of New American restaurants
