= The Compound (restaurant) =

Restaurant in Santa Fe, New Mexico, U.S.

- Interactive map of The Compound

Restaurant information
- Location: 653 Canyon Road, Santa Fe, New Mexico, 87501, United States
- Coordinates: 35°40′57″N 105°55′34″W

The Compound is a restaurant in Santa Fe, New Mexico. It serves American / New American cuisine. In 2023, Condé Nast Traveler included the business in a list of Santa Fe's twelve best restaurants. The Compound was a semifinalist in the Outstanding Restaurant category of the James Beard Foundation Awards in 2024.

== See also ==
- List of New American restaurants
