= The Misfit (restaurant) =

Bar and restaurant in Santa Monica, California, U.S.

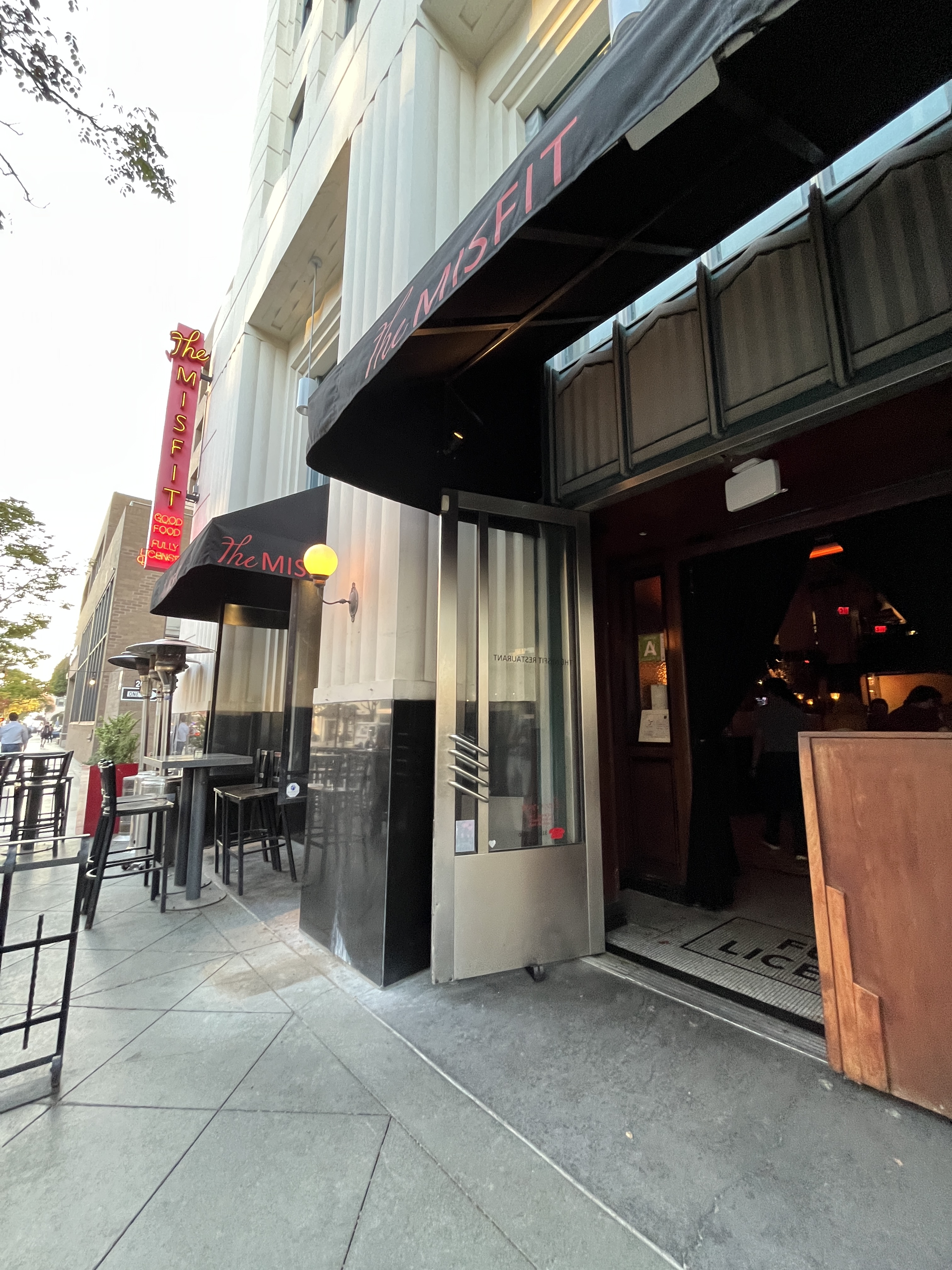
- The restaurant's exterior, 2022
- Interactive map of The Misfit

Restaurant information
- Food type: American; New American
- Location: 225 Santa Monica Boulevard, Santa Monica, California, 90401, United States
- Coordinates: 34.0154°N 118.4967°W
- Website: themisfitbar.com

The Misfit was a bar and restaurant in Santa Monica, California, United States. It closed permanently in 2026.

== Description ==
The Misfit was a bar and restaurant in Santa Monica's Clock Tower Building. Focused on American (or New American) cuisine, the menu had included avocado toast with burrata, tomato, and sourdough, lobster rolls, and macaroni and cheese. The happy hour menu had food and drink options. The Jumping Jack Flash was made with ginger, mint, and Buffalo Trace. The Misfit had a patio. Lonely Planet wrote, "This darkly lit emporium of food, drink and fun is notable for the decent menu and phenomenal cocktails made from craftsman spirits. Set in a historic building decked out with a retro interior, it's busy from brunch to last call."

== History ==
LGO Hospitality opened The Misfit in a space which previously housed Anisette. Chef and LGO founder Bob Lynn developed the opening menu, which included breakfast, lunch and dinner. Bruce Kalman was hired as the opening chef. The restaurant began hiring additional staff in March 2011, and opened on April 28. Lynn has considered opening a second location in Mahnattan's West Village.

In 2011, The Misfit offered fathers select beers for 10 cents on Father's Day. Bob Lynn's son Jordan Lynn became executive chef in December 2011. In 2012, the restaurant hosted a seven-course tasting menu with drinks and a champagne toast for New Year's Eve. The Misfit offered outdoor dining during the COVID-19 pandemic.

The Misfit closed permanently in 2026.

== Reception ==
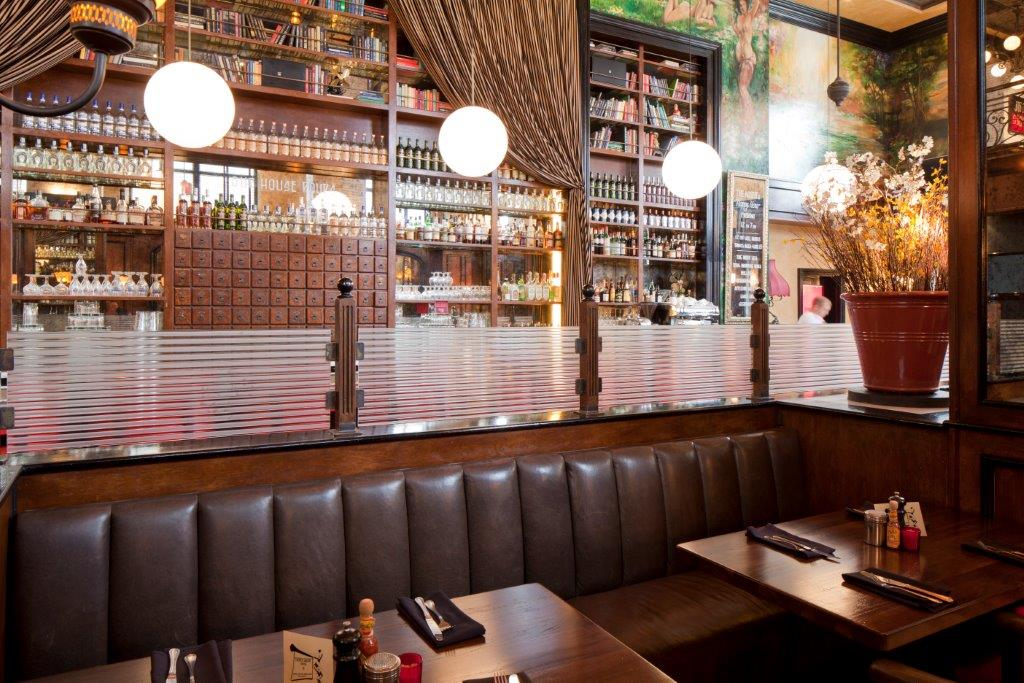
The restaurant's interior

Annie Fitzsimmons recommended the restaurant "for gourmet comfort food and signature cocktails" in National Geographic's 2013 overview of "The Best of Santa Monica". Matthew King included The Misfit in Eater LA's 2014 list of "19 Places to Enjoy Happy Hour Right Now in Los Angeles", writing: "One of the most reliable happy hour scenes in Santa Monica, which means discounted drinks, sangria, cocktails, mimosas, beer and wine, everyday from 12 to 7 p.m., which is perfect for tourists, beach bums, and folks who don't have to hit the office at normal hours." The business was included in Time Out Los Angeles' 2014 list of "the best happy hour deals in Santa Monica."

== See also ==
- List of defunct restaurants of the United States
- List of New American restaurants
