= Dockside Saloon and Restaurant =

Restaurant in Portland, Oregon, U.S.

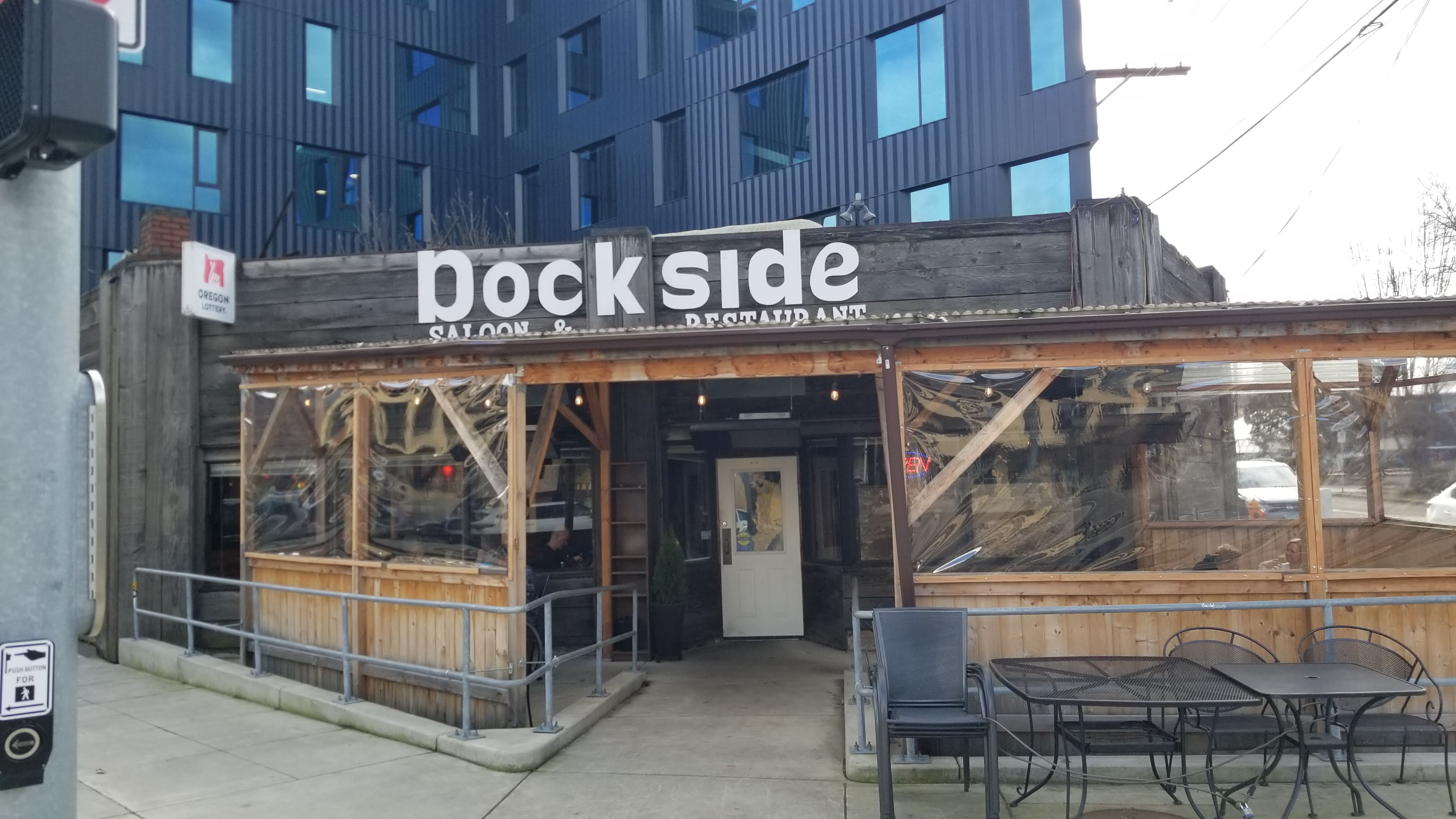
- The restaurant's front exterior, 2024
- Interactive map of Dockside Saloon and Restaurant

Restaurant information
- Established: 1986
- Previous owners: Kathy Peterson; Terry Peterson
- Food type: New American
- Location: 2047 Northwest Front Avenue, Portland, Multnomah, Oregon, 97209, United States
- Coordinates: 45.5377°N 122.6886°W
- Website: docksidesaloon.com

Dockside Saloon and Restaurant, or simply Dockside, is a diner and dive bar in Portland, Oregon, United States. Established in 1986, the nautical-themed, New American restaurant is known for being where incriminating evidence against Tonya Harding related to the assault of Nancy Kerrigan was dumped in 1994.

Dockside was co-owned by Terry Peterson and Kathy Peterson, until they sold the business to Alex Bond in 2023. The bridge-themed menu features classic breakfast options as well as burgers, sandwiches, and tacos for lunch. Sports memorabilia is displayed in the bar's interior.

== Description ==
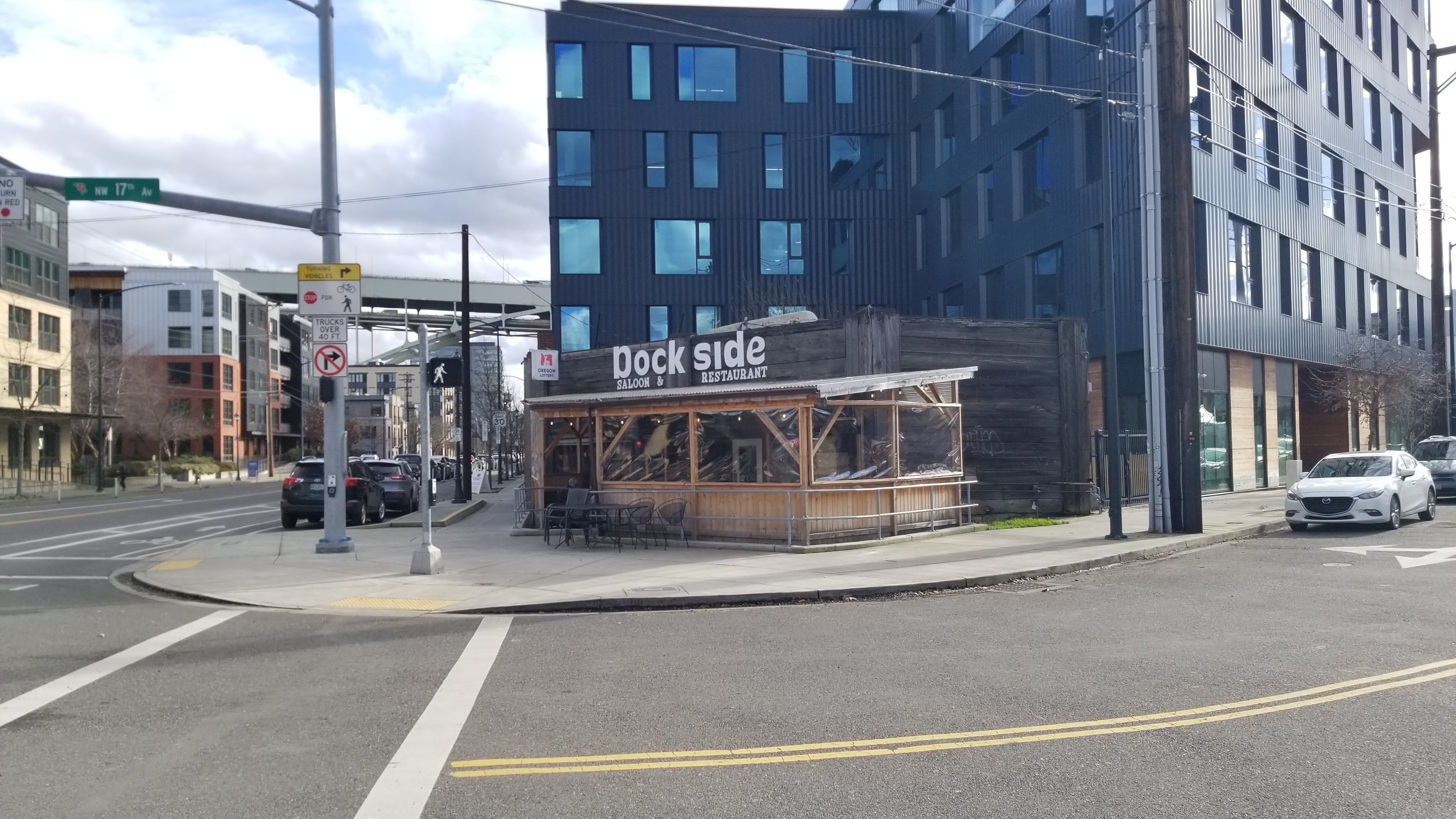
The bar from the northwest corner of 17th and Front in 2024

Dockside is a diner and dive bar on Front Avenue, in northwest Portland's Northwest District. As a result of the owners' refusing to sell their land to developers, the restaurant is a holdout surrounded by new development.

The nautical-themed restaurant serves New American cuisine across a bridge-themed menu. The breakfast menu has included bacon, biscuits, buttermilk pancakes, corned beef hash, eggs, English muffins, and sausage. Terry's Famous Scramble has eggs, bacon, ham, sausage, onions, tomatoes, green peppers, mushrooms, and Tillamook cheddar cheese.

Portland Monthly says, "With elevated highway lanes as a backdrop and a ramshackle exterior, it might be easy to pass over this diner. But loyal customers fill booths of the cozy interior for classic breakfasts piled high with hash browns and lunches of burgers, sandwiches, and tacos while sports and news play on one of the many screens."

The restaurant's menus recount Dockside's connection to assault of Nancy Kerrigan. Dockside also displays sports memorabilia, including shoes which belonged to LaMarcus Aldridge, Bob Lanier, and Shaquille O'Neal, as well as Clyde Drexler's jersey.

== History ==
Chef Terry Peterson and Kathy Peterson were co-owners of the business, which was established in 1986 in an unoccupied building which was constructed in 1925. Previously, the building had housed Dot's Sternwheeler and What's Up Doc.

In 1994, Kathy Peterson discovered incriminating evidence related to the assault of Nancy Kerrigan in the restaurant's dumpster. The Dockside has been used as a film site multiple times, including for The Hunted and Maverick.

The Petersons sold the business to Alex Bond in 2023.

== Reception ==
In 2013, Dockside won in the Best Menu Brag category of Willamette Week's annual "Best of Portland" readers' poll. In 2017, Suzette Smith of the Portland Mercury wrote:

Dockside Saloon is in a really, really weird location off NW Naito—across from the sad, isolated riverfront condos that are always in some state of industrial handrail construction turmoil. Dockside either once was (or likely still is) the hangout spot for many blue-collar factory worker types, but it wasn’t very busy when I went in. Signature signs of lovable, eccentric bar management are present: saran-wrapped cookies for sale, a whole candy jar full of nothing but Doublemint gum, and a bathroom that doesn't lock (in fact, it’s a saloon-door situation). The thing about Dockside is that, at the end of the day, you get the happy hour clam chowder and when it comes it’s basically four dollars’ worth of soup for $3.95. You order the Caesar salad and it's a four-dollar salad. The food is fine—probably a step more flavorful than typical bar fare—but there isn’t a 'deal' feeling to it.

Michael Russell included Dockside in The Oregonian's 2019 lists of the 40 and 10 "best inexpensive restaurants" in the Portland metropolitan area and downtown Portland, respectively.

== See also ==
- List of diners
- List of dive bars
- List of New American restaurants
