= Roost (restaurant) =

Defunct restaurant in Portland, Oregon, U.S.

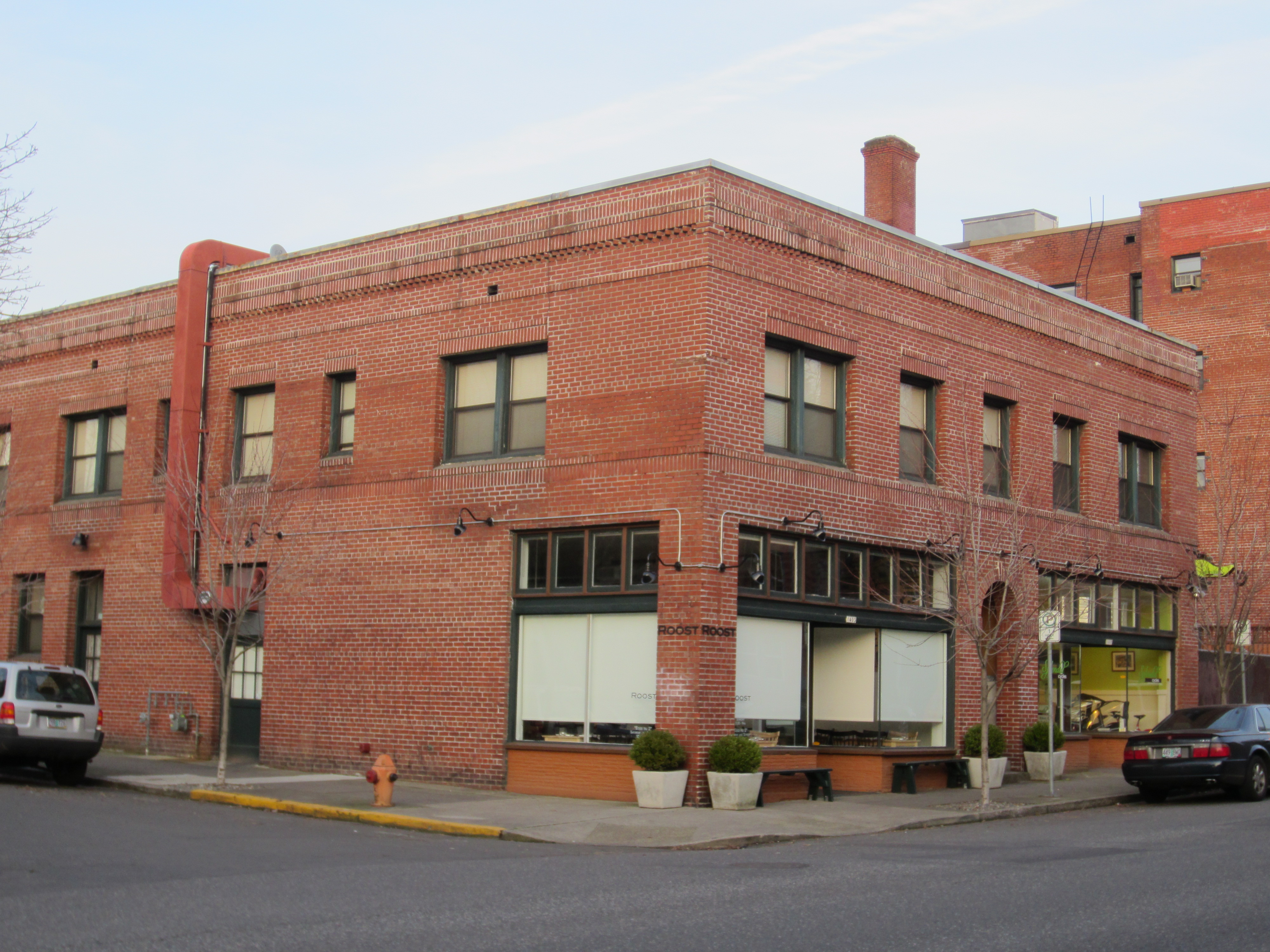
- The restaurant's exterior, 2012
- Interactive map of Roost

Restaurant information
- Established: September 2010
- Closed: October 2018
- Owner: Megan Henzel
- Chef: Megan Henzel
- Food type: American; New American
- Location: 1403 Southeast Belmont Street, Portland, Multnomah, Oregon, 97214, United States
- Coordinates: 45.5167°N 122.6514°W
- Seating capacity: 43

Roost was an American / New American restaurant in Portland, Oregon. Megan Henzel was the chef and owner.

== Description ==
The American / New American restaurant Roost operated at the intersection of 14th Avenue and Belmont Street in southeast Portland's Buckman neighborhood. It was described as having a "stark" decor and had a large "R" logo on one of its windows. The eatery had a seating capacity of approximately 43 people.

=== Menu ===
Portland Monthly said the restaurant offered a "classic, New England style of comfort food, but with modern touches and a flavorful boost from regional ingredients". The menu included cod cakes with poached eggs, dill sour cream, and sautéed spinach, as well as ricotta pancakes with bacon, berries, and maple syrup. The restaurant also served smoked trout, corn fritters, zucchini fries, skirt steak, stews, cauliflower and potato gratin, and an upscale version of a sloppy joe (braised beef in caul fat, served on an open-faced bun with watercress, aioli, horseradish, and jus). The brunch menu included steak and eggs.

== History ==
The restaurant opened in September 2010. It closed in October 2018 and was replaced by Farm Spirit.

== See also ==
- List of New American restaurants
