= One If By Land, Two If By Sea (restaurant) =

Restaurant in New York City

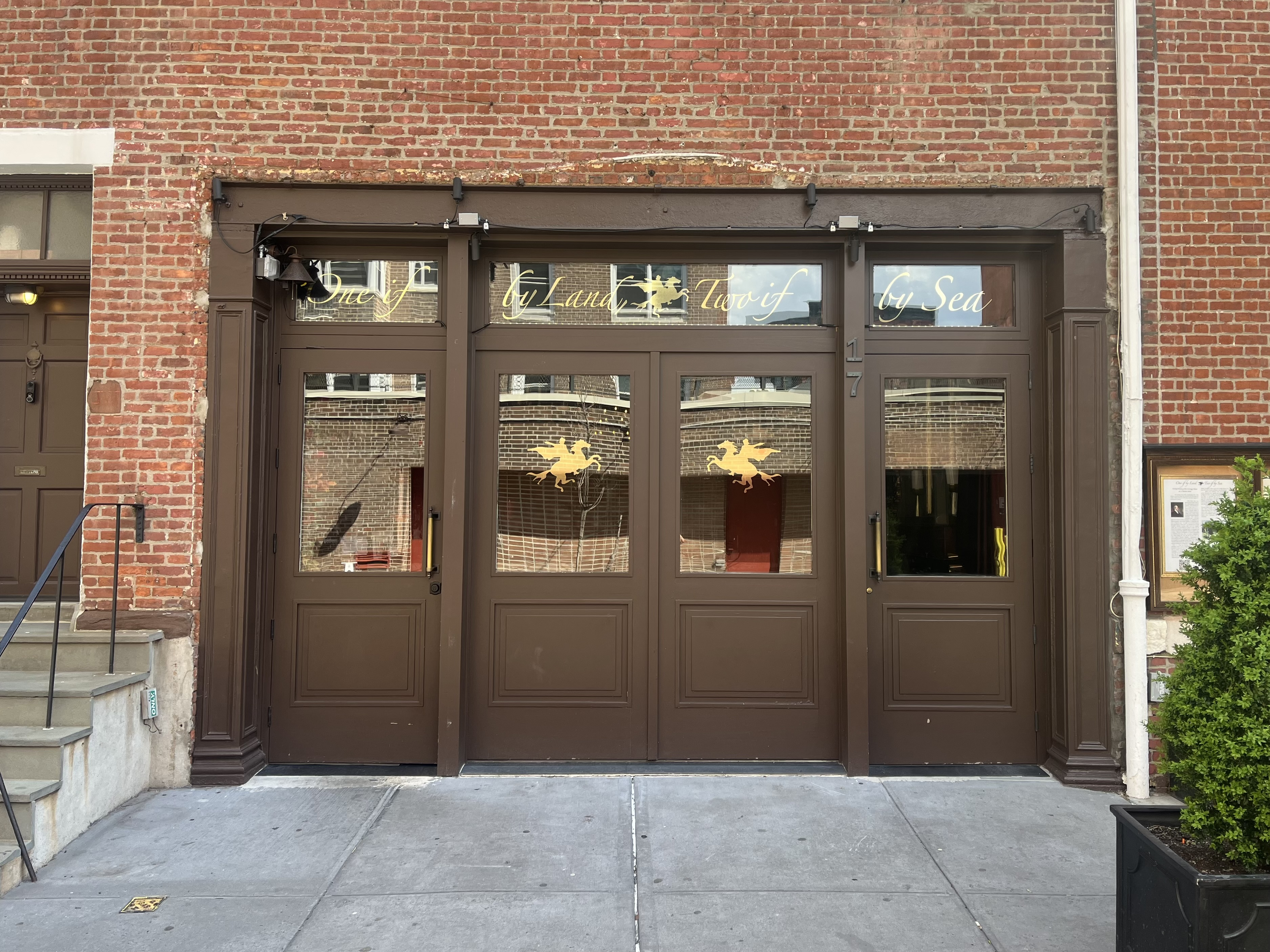
- The restaurant's exterior in 2024
- Interactive map of One If By Land, Two If By Sea

Restaurant information
- Established: 1910; 116 years ago
- Food type: New American; French
- Location: 17 Barrow Street between Seventh Avenue South and West Fourth Street, Manhattan, New York City, New York, United States
- Coordinates: 40.732606°N 74.0027°W
- Website: oneifbyland.com

One If By Land, Two If By Sea is a fine dining restaurant located at 17 Barrow Street between Seventh Avenue South and West Fourth Street in the West Village in Manhattan, New York City.

== Reviews and reception ==
In 2013, Zagat gave it a food rating of 24, with a decor rating of 27, and wrote: "'Prepare to be swept away' by this 'gorgeous' Village American." In 1998, as food critic for The New York Times, Ruth Reichl gave the restaurant a mixed, one star review. She criticized the restaurant's Beef Wellington. In 2005, also as the restaurant critic for the New York Times, Frank Bruni gave the restaurant a negative review, criticizing the food, and concluding it was too reliant on its ambience and reputation.

== See also ==
- List of New American restaurants
