= Normandie (restaurant) =

Restaurant in Portland, Oregon, U.S.

- Interactive map of Normandie

Restaurant information
- Food type: European; New American
- Location: 1005 Southeast Ankeny Street, Portland, Multnomah, Oregon, 97214, United States
- Coordinates: 45.5223°N 122.6554°W
- Seating capacity: 62
- Website: normandiepdx.com

Normandie is a restaurant in Portland, Oregon, United States. Established in 2018, it operates in southeast Portland's Buckman neighborhood.

== Description ==
The New American and European restaurant Normandie operates at 10th and Ankeny in southeast Portland's Buckman neighborhood. Portland Monthly has described Normandie as a "seafood-heavy Frenchish bistro". According to Eater Portland, "The aquatic-themed restaurant Normandie draws influence for its cuisine from across the globe, including Celtic French and Southeast Asian." The menu includes oysters, a burger with alpine cheese, onions, and onion rings on brioche, and cocktails.

The restaurant has a seating capacity of 62 people.

== History ==
Normandie opened on October 18, 2018. It operates in the space that previously housed Rue. Normandie is owned by chef Heather Kintler, Judson Winquist, and Amanda Cannon Winquist.

For Valentine's Day in 2024, Normandie offered a three-course tasting menu with poached prawn salad, seared king salmon, and vanilla bean meringues. The restaurant operated via outdoor dining and take-out at times during the COVID-19 pandemic.

== Reception ==
Michael Russell included the burger in The Oregonian's 2018 overview of Portland's best new burgers. Portland Monthly included Normandie in a 2025 list of the city's 50 best restaurants. Brooke Jackson-Glidden, Katrina Yentch, and Rebecca Roland included the business in Eater Portland's 2025 overview of the city's best French restaurants. Ben Coleman included Normandie in the website's 2025 list of Portland's best seafood. Dianne de Guzman included the business in Eater Portland's 2025 overview of the city's best bars and restaurants for happy hour. Hannah Wallace included the business in Condé Nast Traveler's 2025 list of Portland's 23 best restaurants.

== See also ==
- List of New American restaurants
