= Copine (restaurant) =

Defunct restaurant in Seattle, Washington, U.S.

- Interactive map of Copine

Restaurant information
- Closed: 2026
- Food type: American/New American
- Location: 6460 24th Avenue NW, Seattle, King, Washington, 98107, United States
- Coordinates: 47°40′32.5″N 122°23′14.5″W

Copine was a restaurant in Seattle's Ballard neighborhood, in the U.S. state of Washington. It closed permanently in 2026.

== Description ==
Copine was an American/New American restaurant in Seattle's Ballard neighborhood. The restaurant opened in July 2016. The restaurant's founders, Shaun McCrain and Jill Kinney, searched for a location to open the restaurant for more than a year. Before founding Copine, McCrain worked for Per Se. McCrain and Kinney worked at Seattle restaurant Book Bindery before departing; Book Bindery closed after their departure.

In December 2025, Copine announced plans to close permanently in May 2026.

== Reception ==
Condé Nast Traveler recommends, "Pick another spot for that calamitous catch-up with the old high school crew, and save Copine for a quiet date, a strategy session with your business partner, or a big night out with mom and dad." In 2022, Aimee Rizzo included Copine in The Infatuation's overviews of Seattle's best takeout eateries and Ballard's best restaurants. In 2023, the restaurant was a finalist in the James Beard Foundation Award's Outstanding Restaurant category.

== See also ==
- List of defunct restaurants of the United States
- List of New American restaurants
