= The Lobby (restaurant) =

Restaurant in Chicago, Illinois, U.S.

- Interactive map of The Lobby

Restaurant information
- Location: 108 East Superior Street, Chicago, Illinois, 60611, United States
- Coordinates: 41°53′45.5″N 87°37′30.5″W

The Lobby is a restaurant on the fifth floor of The Peninsula Chicago in Chicago, Illinois. The restaurant serves American / New American cuisine and received a Michelin star in 2014. The restaurant serves breakfast, lunch, and dinner, as well as afternoon tea and weekly brunch.

== See also ==
- List of Michelin-starred restaurants in Chicago
- List of New American restaurants
