= Alberta Street Pub =

Music venue and restaurant in Portland, Oregon, U.S.

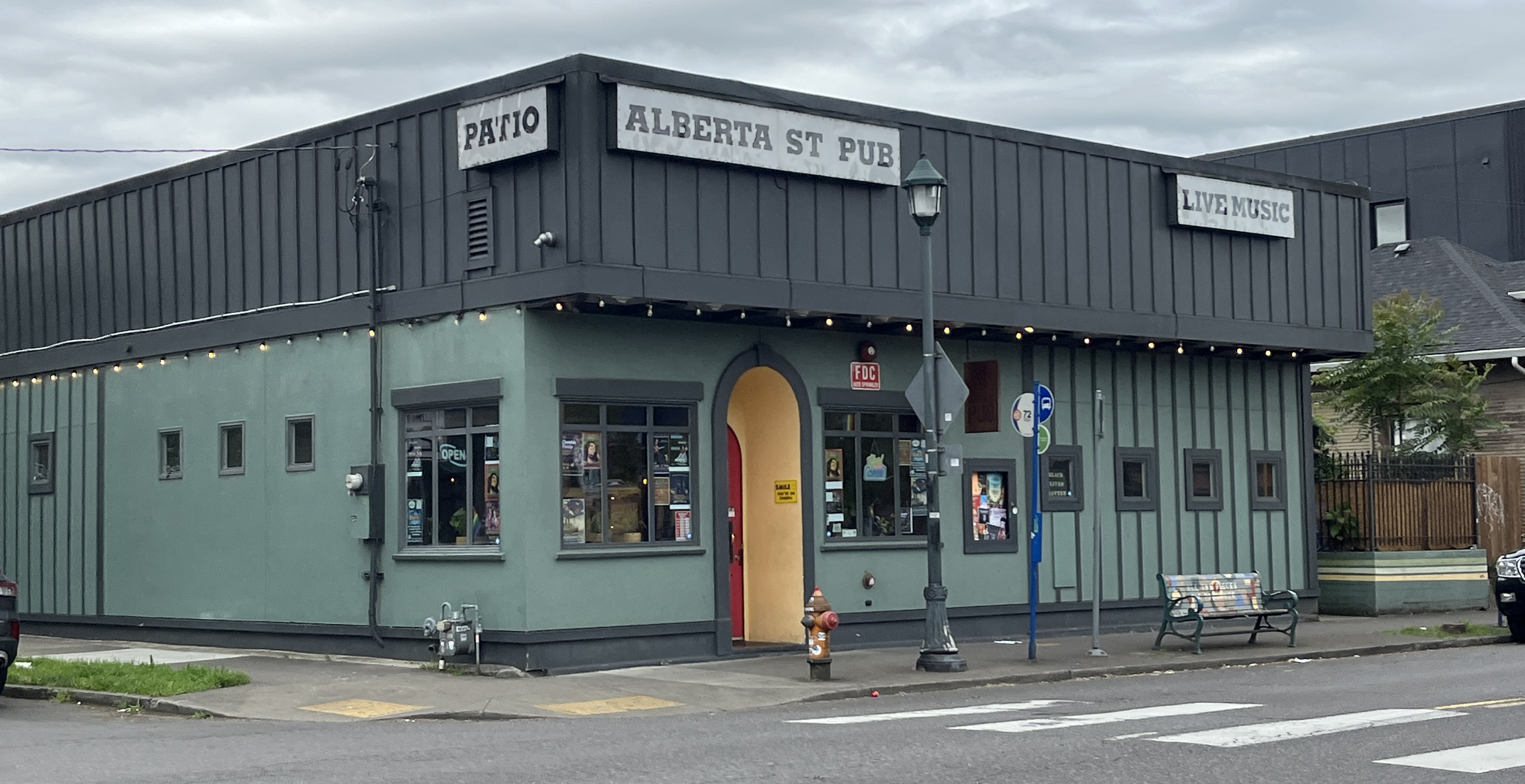
- The venue's exterior, 2025
- Interactive map of Alberta Street Pub

Restaurant information
- Food type: New American
- Location: 1036 Northeast Alberta Street, Portland, Multnomah, Oregon, 97211, United States
- Coordinates: 45.5589°N 122.6548°W
- Website: albertastreetpub.com

Alberta Street Pub is a music venue and restaurant in Portland, Oregon's King neighborhood, in the United States.

== Description and history ==
Kevin Sandri became executive chef in 2013, when the pub reopened after a six-month renovation. The updated menu included duck Cubano, fried octopus, Korean-style pork ribs, and chickpea and porchetta sandwiches. Sandri and the restaurant launched brunch in June 2013, serving chile relleno with chorizo, crème brulee French toast, and "green eggs and lamb" with mint pistou. Sandri left in October 2013.

The restaurant screened U.S. presidential election results in 2016.

In her 2021 overview of "Where to Eat and Drink on Alberta", Eater Portland's Brooke Jackson-Glidden wrote, "This cozy, laid-back bar is the place to be for Old Alberta swagger and a rotating menu of 21 draughts. The covered outdoor patio is a primo spot to kill a few hours, and the Alberta Street Pub is one of the few venues actually hosting shows on its socially distanced patio." During the COVID-19 pandemic, the bar offered limited indoor seating, as of April 2021. Eater Portland's Jenni Moore said in 2021:

Previously known as Love Train and then Alberta Street Public House, Alberta Street Pub has been a stalwart for food and brews for 30 years. After hosting musicians on the patio for months, the bar and venue welcomed artists and audiences back into the show room in July. Portland R&B singer Rich Hunter, rock-and-soul musician Redray Frazier, and drummer Tyrone Hendrix often make appearances, and the venue has regularly recurring themed nights, like the Sunday Pocket and Hump Day Cabaret. In addition to hosting live local music in a small venue space, the pub boasts a great patio, 21 rotating taps, craft cocktails, and a menu of crispy fried catfish, fried pickles, pulled BBQ jackfruit sandwiches, and more.

== See also ==
- Culture of Portland, Oregon
- List of New American restaurants
