= Hattie's Hat =

Restaurant in Seattle, Washington, U.S.

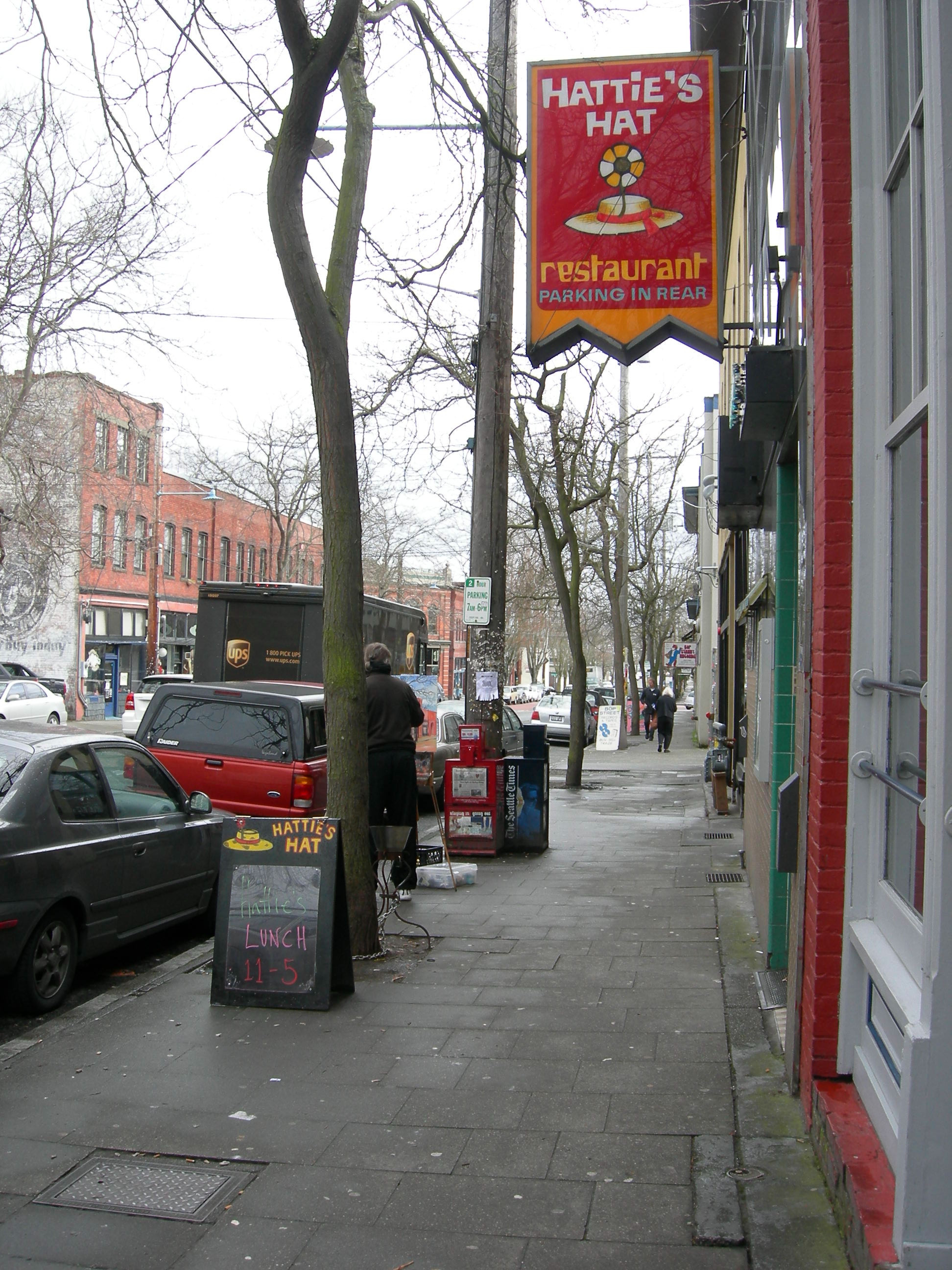
- Entrance to the restaurant in 2007
- Interactive map of Hattie's Hat

Restaurant information
- Food type: American; New American
- Location: Seattle, King, Washington, United States
- Coordinates: 47°39′58″N 122°22′59.5″W
- Website: hatties-hat.com

Hattie's Hat is a restaurant in Seattle's Ballard neighborhood, in the U.S. state of Washington.

== Description and history ==
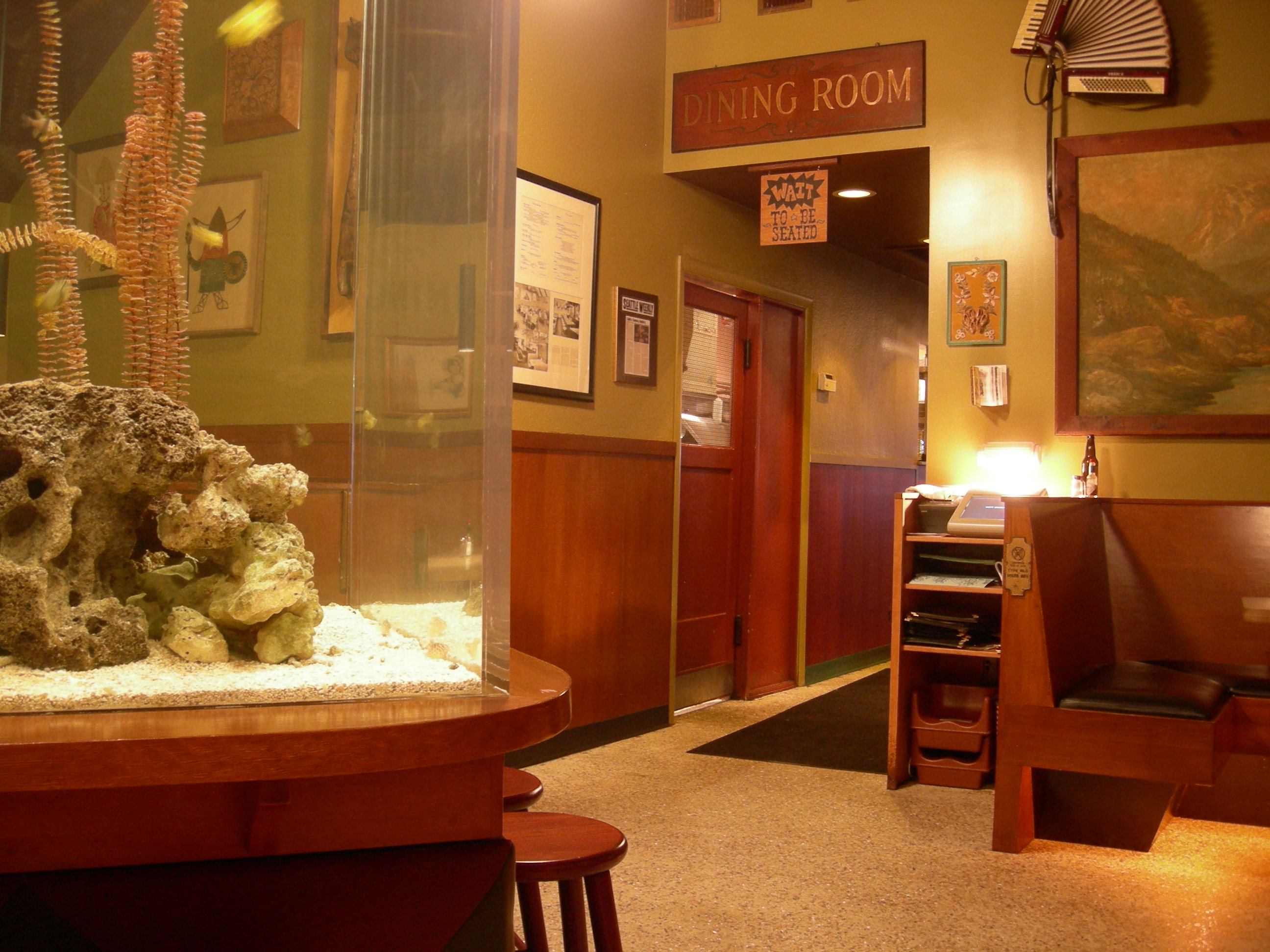
The restaurant's interior, 2007

According to Lonely Planet, "This classic old divey bar has been around in some guise or other since 1904." The restaurant had a stint as a fine dining establishment. The interior has murals of nature.

The menu has many items with beets. Hattie's Hat serves American/New American cuisine such as a burger with Cajun spices, smoked ribs, and grilled cheese with a salad or yam fries on the side. For brunch, the restaurant has served eggs Benedict, a "flannel" hash with corned beef and beets, Swedish pancakes, and Bloody Marys.

Max Genereaux has been the owner since 2009.

== See also ==
- List of New American restaurants
