= Lark (restaurant) =

Restaurant in Seattle, Washington, U.S.

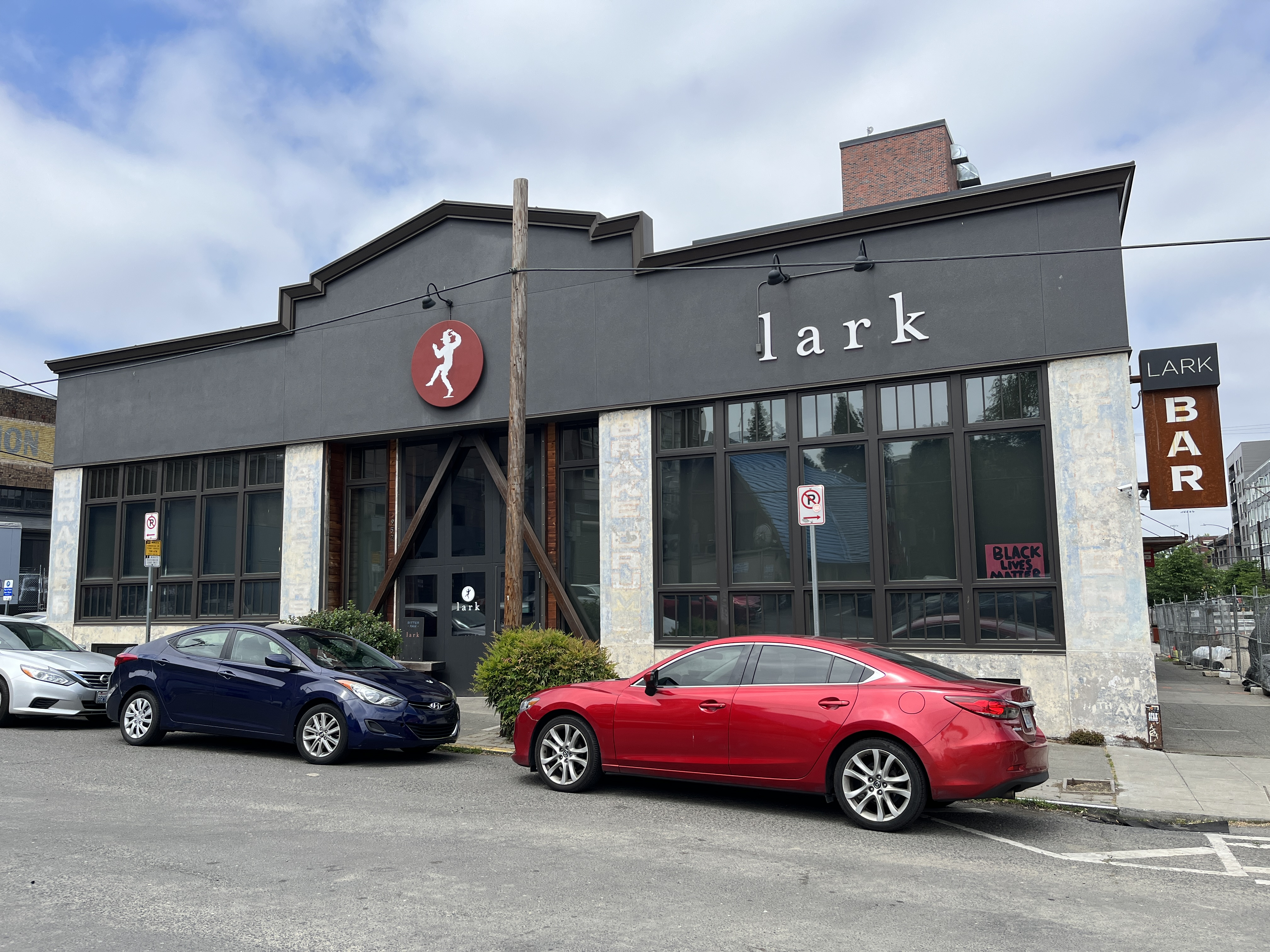
- The restaurant's exterior, 2023
- Interactive map of Lark

Restaurant information
- Location: 952 E Seneca St., Seattle, King, Washington, 98122, United States
- Coordinates: 47°36′44.5″N 122°19′11″W
- Website: larkseattle.com

Lark is a restaurant in Seattle's First Hill neighborhood, in the U.S. state of Washington. John Sundstrom is the chef.

== Description ==
Lark is a New American and seafood restaurant. The menu has included yellowtail carpaccio.

== History ==
The restaurant relocated to East Seneca Street in late 2014.

== Reception ==
Condé Nast Traveler has described Lark as "The ultimate night-away-from-the-kids restaurant". In 2023, the restaurant was a semifinalist in the James Beard Foundation Award's Outstanding Hospitality category. Lark was included in Eater Seattle's 2025 overview of the best restaurants on Capitol Hill.

== See also ==
- List of New American restaurants
- List of seafood restaurants
