= Betony (restaurant) =

Defunct restaurant in New York City

- Interactive map of Betony

Restaurant information
- Established: 2013
- Closed: December 31, 2016
- Food type: New American
- Location: 41 West 57th Street, New York City, New York, 10019, United States
- Coordinates: 40°45′50.8″N 73°58′34.4″W

Betony was a restaurant in New York City. The restaurant served New American cuisine.

== Reception ==
In 2013, Pete Wells of The New York Times rated the restaurant 3 out of 4 stars and the restaurant received a Michelin star in 2015.

== See also ==
- List of Michelin-starred restaurants in New York City
- List of New American restaurants
