= Protégé (restaurant) =

Restaurant in Palo Alto, California, U.S. that serves New American cuisine

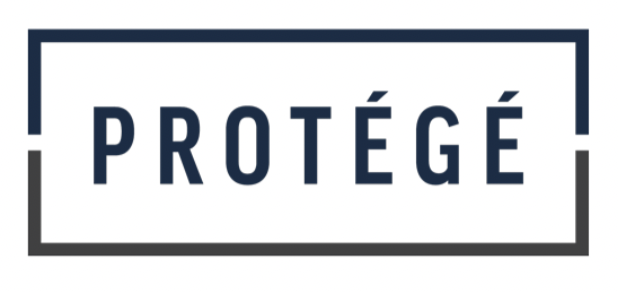
- Interactive map of Protégé

Restaurant information
- Established: March 2018
- Owners: Dennis Kelly and Anthony Secviar
- Head chef: Anthony Secviar
- Pastry chef: Dhalia Cruz
- Food type: New American
- Rating: (Michelin Guide)
- Location: 250 California Avenue, Palo Alto, California, 94306, United States
- Coordinates: 37°25′40″N 122°08′38″W
- Seating capacity: 20 (dining room) 40 (lounge)
- Reservations: Required for dining room
- Website: protegepaloalto.com

Protégé is a New American restaurant in Palo Alto, California, United States. It was opened in 2018 by Dennis Kelly and Anthony Secviar, both previously of The French Laundry in Yountville, and has a Michelin star.

== History ==
Dennis Kelly and Anthony Secviar, who had worked at The French Laundry as a sommelier and a sous chef, announced in 2016 that they planned to open an "approachable fine dining" restaurant in Palo Alto, with a target opening date of early 2017. The first pastry chef, Eddie Lopez, had also worked at The French Laundry. The venture was backed by 50 investors, most of them local.

The restaurant was approved by the Palo Alto City Council in June 2017. It opened in March 2018, and was awarded a Michelin star in November 2018.

== Restaurant ==
Protégé is on the ground floor of an office building on California Avenue in Palo Alto, built in 2015. When it opened, Baumé, which had two Michelin stars, was on the same block. The restaurant was designed by Jon de la Cruz, who also designed Che Fico in San Francisco: it features a caramel palette (blue in the private dining room), walnut butcher-block dining room tables, and velvet-covered banquettes, and the bar has a backdrop of colorful bottles and the dining room a mural photograph of a redwood grove in homage to the tree for which the city was named. Secviar is the head chef and Kelly the sommelier; since 2023, the pastry chef is Dhali Cruz.

The restaurant serves a four-course prix fixe dinner in the 20-seat dining room and an à la carte menu in the walk-in lounge, which seats 40 including at the bar. The cuisine is New American with French and Spanish influences, using seasonal ingredients.

== Reception ==
Three months after it opened, the long-term restaurant reviewer for the San Francisco Chronicle, Michael Bauer, described Protégé as "a stunning restaurant with all the attention to detail but little of the pretense of the French Laundry". Later that summer, a reviewer for the Palo Alto Daily News judged it already worthy of Michelin stars. In the announcement that the restaurant had been awarded a star, Michelin Guide reviewers wrote that it "displays a level of finesse to prepare consistently excellent meals, while the dining experience remains casual and approachable." Protégé was on the Chronicle's list of the best new restaurants of 2018, and in 2021 a Chronicle article on restaurants' bread offerings noted then pastry chef Emma Alden's soft pretzels served with honey butter.

== Related ventures ==
Secviar and Kelly opened a cocktail bar called Bar Underdog in 2025, also on California Avenue. As of May 2026, it was a success.

== See also ==
- List of Michelin-starred restaurants in California
- List of New American restaurants
