= Take Root (restaurant) =

Defunct restaurant in New York City, U.S.

- Interactive map of Take Root

Restaurant information
- Established: 2013
- Closed: 2017
- Food type: New American
- Location: 187 Sackett Street, Brooklyn, New York, 11231, United States
- Coordinates: 40°41′4.2″N 74°0′0.7″W

Take Root was a restaurant in New York City. The restaurant served New American cuisine and had received a Michelin star.

== See also ==
- List of defunct restaurants of the United States
- List of Michelin-starred restaurants in New York City
- List of New American restaurants
