= Chace's Pancake Corral =

Restaurant in Bellevue, Washington, U.S.

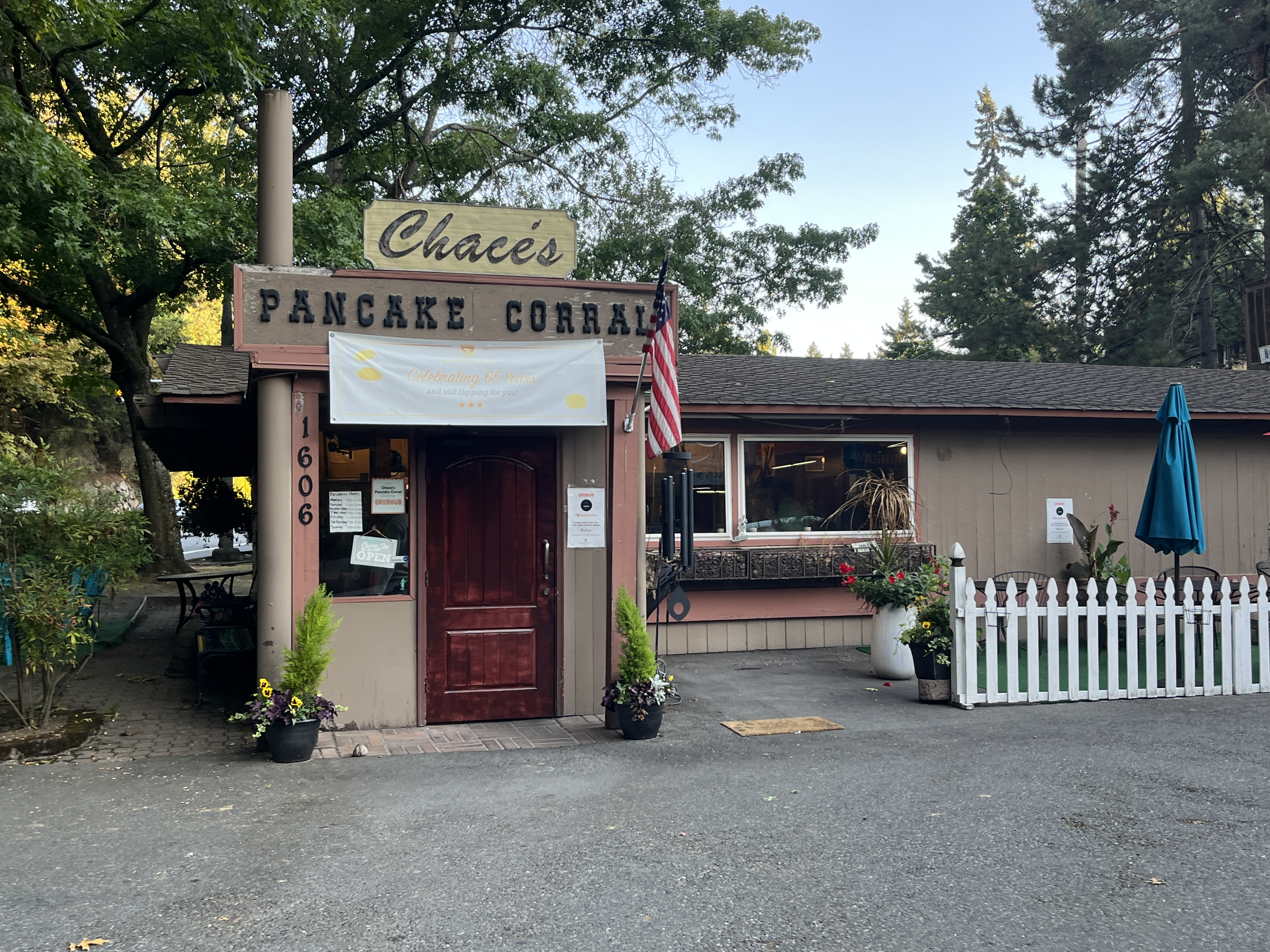
- The restaurant's exterior, 2023
- Interactive map of Chace's Pancake Corral

Restaurant information
- Food type: American; New American
- Location: 1606 Bellevue Way SE, Bellevue, Washington, 98004, United States
- Coordinates: 47°35′47″N 122°11′52.5″W
- Website: pancakecorral.com

Chace's Pancake Corral is a family-owned restaurant in Bellevue, Washington, United States. Established in the 1950s, Chace's is the city's oldest restaurant.

== Description ==
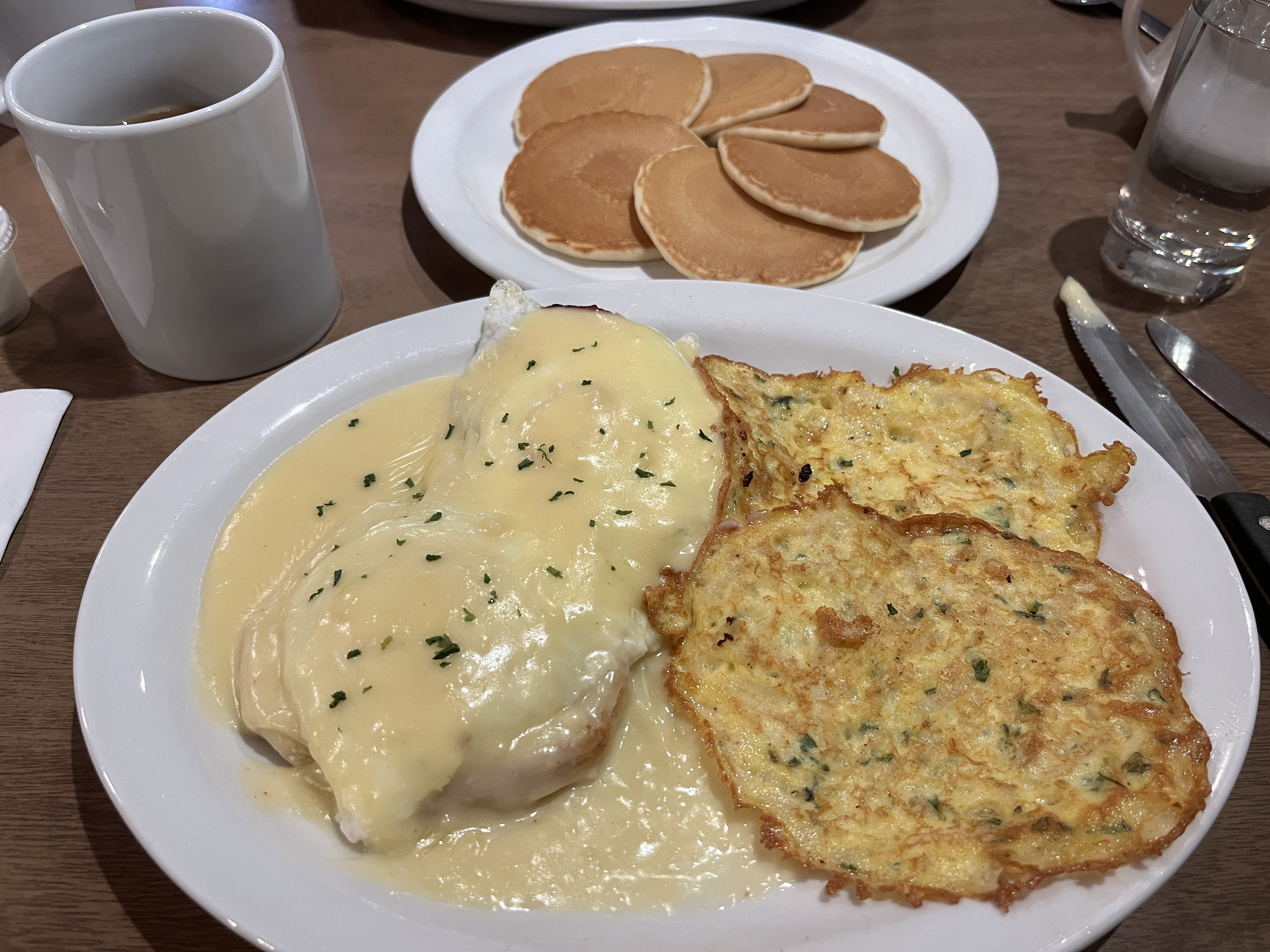
Dollar pancakes (top), Eggs Benedict (bottom left), and potato pancakes (bottom right)

Seattle Metropolitan has said, "Chace's is ancient, tiny, crowded, cramped, and loaded with character. The pancakes and other stock breakfast items are just exactly what you would expect, God love 'em."

In addition to pancakes, the American / New American menu has included scrambles and bacon. The Coach's Pick, named after Mercer Island High School boys basketball head coach Ed Pepple, has crepe-style pancakes and an apple glaze. Chace's has served Boyd's Coffee. The restaurant is very popular on weekend mornings.

== History ==
Chace's is Bellevue's oldest restaurant. Named after Bill Chace, the family-operated restaurant was established in 1957 or 1958. Jane Zakskorn is the owner, as of 2019.

== Reception ==
Chace's ranked first in the Best Breakfast category of the Bellevue Reporter's annual 'Best of Bellevue' readers' poll each year from 2009 to 2013. The business received honorable mention in the Breakfast category in 2016, and was a finalist in the Breakfast and Family Restaurant categories in 2021. Chace's is reportedly Félix Hernández's favorite restaurant.

== See also ==
- List of New American restaurants
