= Elements (restaurant) =

- Interactive map of Elements

Restaurant information
- Established: 2008
- Owner: Steven Distler
- Head chef: Scott Anderson
- Food type: New American
- Dress code: Smart casual
- Location: 66 Witherspoon St., Princeton, Mercer, New Jersey, 08540, United States
- Coordinates: 40.3514709°N 74.660878°W
- Other locations: 163 Bayard Lane*
- Other information: * location is closed
- Website: www.elementsprinceton.com

Elements is a New American fine dining restaurant located in Princeton, New Jersey which reopened on August 11, 2015 at its new location on Witherspoon Street in downtown Princeton. The restaurant originally opened in 2008 on Bayard Lane in Princeton and closed in 2014 while the new location was developed.

== Development ==
Founder and owner Steven Distler, a semiretired private-equity executive of Bank of Princeton, purchased and renovated the property from an auto-repair garage next to a gas station.

Distler hired executive chef Scott Anderson, a Rutgers graduate and former associate of restaurant Nova Terra in New Brunswick. He has never been formally trained, but spent six years at the Ryland Inn, where he became the head chef before that restaurant closed. Business partner Laurent Chapuis, owner of the Princeton Corkscrew Wine Shop, introduced Anderson and Distler. Anderson is currently an equity partner in the restaurant.

Elements closed at its first location in Princeton after dinner service on June 28, 2014. It reopened, in the building that also houses their other restaurant Mistral, on August 11, 2015. Mistral remained open during the renovations. Both locations share Mistral's liquor license since the reopening.

== Menu ==
Elements has a seasonally-changing menu and serves an array of different cuisines ranging from chicken liver pâté to locally sourced grits to Laughing Bird shrimp. Elements offers a variety of wines, with bottle prices ranging from $26 to $2,700.

== Ratings ==
In a 2009 review, New Jersey Monthly described Elements as one of the best restaurants in New Jersey, praising Anderson's imagination, and work ethic. Wine Spectator praised Anderson's spaghetti carbonara in 2010.

In 2012, Elements was voted both best brunch and best lunch in New Jersey Monthly's 29th Annual Jersey Choice Restaurant Poll and was ranked the 35th-best restaurant in the United States by OpinionatedAboutDining.com, as reported by Forbes.

In 2013, New Jersey Monthly named Elements as a Top 25 restaurant, praising Scott Anderson for his revival of artisanal techniques of preserving food.

Scott Anderson was a semi-finalist contender in the 2014 James Beard Chef Award for best Mid-Atlantic chefs.

== See also ==
- List of New American restaurants
