= King's Carriage House =

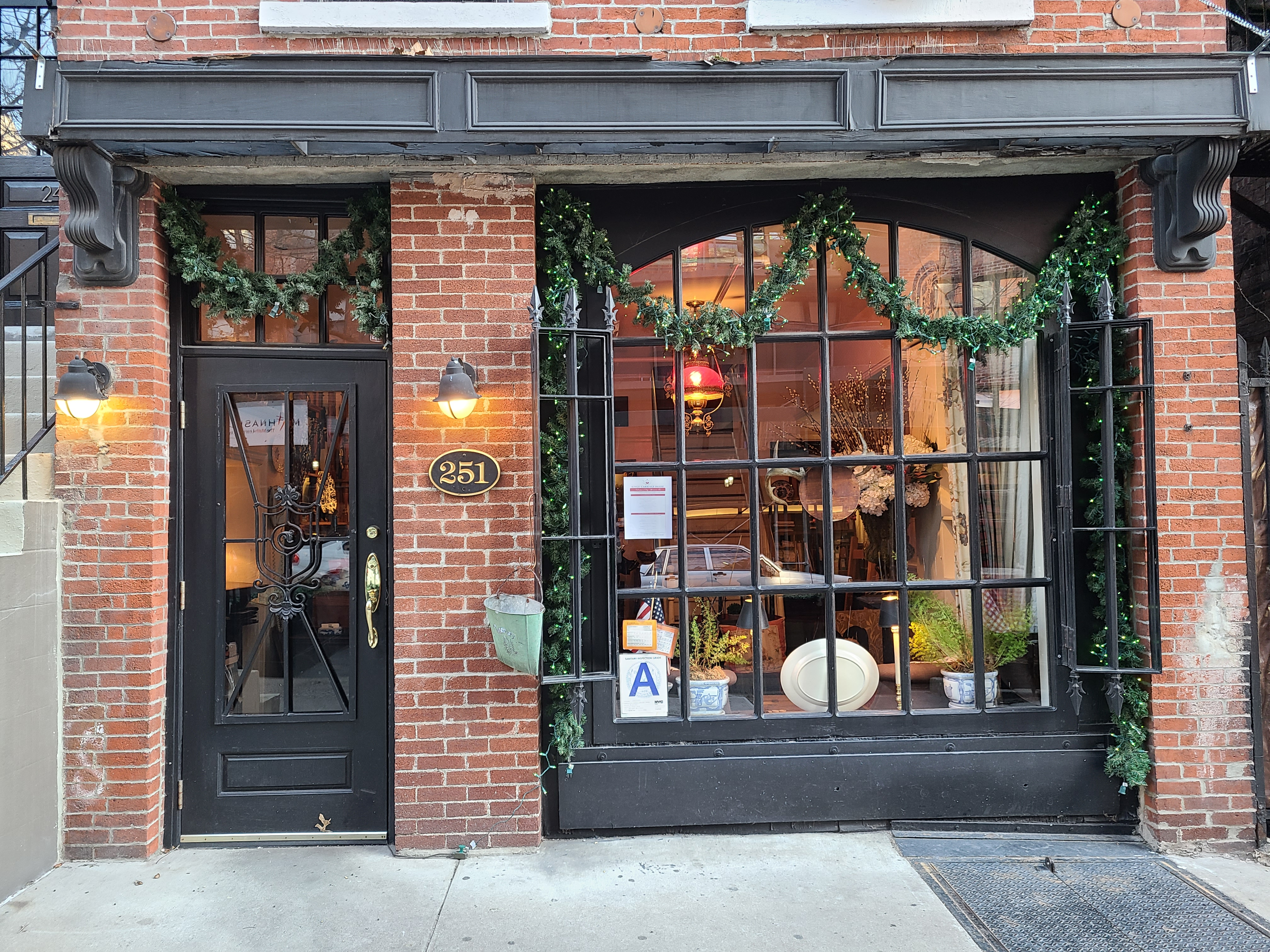
- Photographed in 2023
- Interactive map of King's Carriage House

Restaurant information
- Established: 1995
- Owners: Elizabeth King and Paul Farrell
- Chef: Elizabeth King
- Food type: New American cuisine
- Dress code: Jackets optional
- Location: 251 East 82nd Street (between Second Avenue and Third Avenue), on the Upper East Side in Manhattan, New York City, New York, 10028, United States
- Coordinates: 40.775551°N 73.953967°W
- Reservations: Suggested
- Website: www.kingscarriagehouse.com

King's Carriage House is a New American cuisine restaurant, tea room, and wine bar located at 251 East 82nd Street (between Second Avenue and Third Avenue), on the Upper East Side in Manhattan, in New York City.

It opened in 1995. It is owned by Elizabeth King (a chef) and Paul Farrell (who runs the dining room).

== Menu ==
The restaurant serves afternoon tea from 3 to 4 PM, for which reservations are required. The dinnwe includes items such as grilled filet mignon, pan roasted breast of duck and wild salmon.

== Restaurant ==
The small four-room restaurant is an 1870s former carriage house . The restaurant has antique wood furniture, tartan curtains, and antique silver teapots. It has three dining rooms: the Hunt Room, the Red Room, and the Willow Room. The attire is "jackets optional".

== Reviews ==
In 2013, Zagats gave the restaurant a food rating of 22, and a decor rating of 25.

== See also ==
- List of New American restaurants
