= Localis (restaurant) =

Restaurant in Sacramento, California, U.S.

- Interactive map of Localis

Restaurant information
- Food type: New American
- Location: Sacramento, California, United States
- Coordinates: 38.5664°N 121.4828°W
- Website: localissacramento.com

Localis is a restaurant in Sacramento, California. It serves New American cuisine and has received a Michelin star.

== See also ==
- List of Michelin-starred restaurants in California
- List of New American restaurants
