= Mike's Chili Parlor =

Restaurant in Seattle, Washington, U.S.

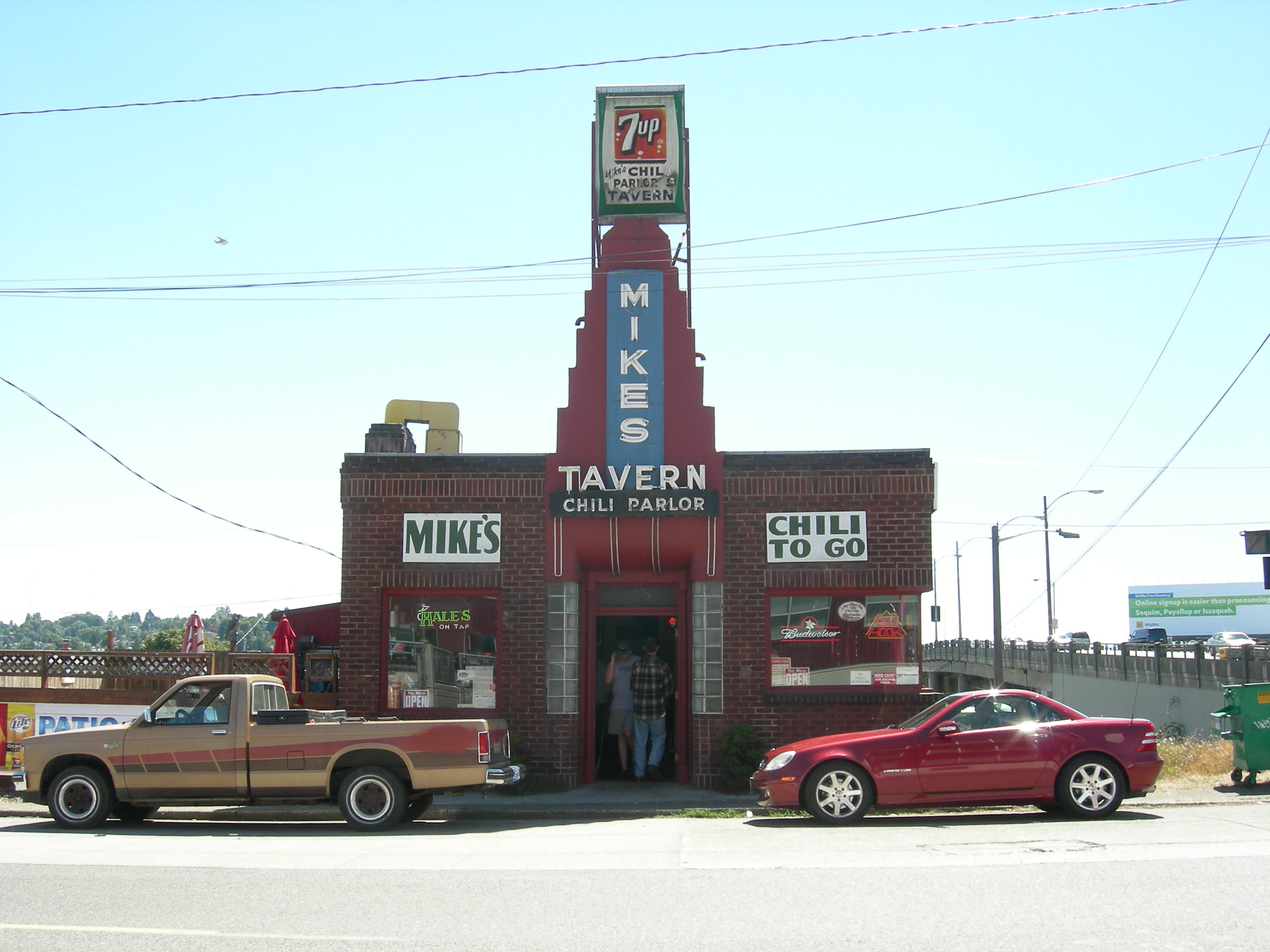
- Exterior in 2007
- Interactive map of Mike's Chili Parlor

Restaurant information
- Food type: American; New American
- Location: 447 NW Ballard Way, Seattle, Washington, 98107, United States
- Coordinates: 47°39′46″N 122°22′32.8″W

Mike's Chili Parlor is a restaurant in Seattle, in the U.S. state of Washington. The American / New American restaurant has appeared on the television series Diners, Drive-Ins and Dives.

== See also ==
- List of Diners, Drive-Ins and Dives episodes
- List of New American restaurants
