= New American cuisine =

Type of cuisine

New American cuisine, also known as Modern American cuisine or Contemporary American cuisine, is the wave of modernized cooking predominantly served at upscale fine dining restaurants in the United States, originating in the 1980s. New American cuisine is generally a type of fusion cuisine which assimilates flavors from the melting pot of traditional American cooking techniques mixed with foreign and sometimes molecular gastronomy components. There is often a focus on fresh, local, and seasonal farm-to-table ingredients.

The movement was popularized in the 1990s by various celebrity chefs, including Wolfgang Puck, Jeremiah Tower, Alice Waters, and Jonathan Waxman.

New American cuisine features innovative use of seasoning and sauces. Originally based on French, nouvelle, and traditional American cuisine, New American has since progressed to include elements of Mediterranean, Latin American, Asian, and other cuisines.

== See also ==
- Fusion cuisine
