= Sixteen (restaurant) =

Restaurant on the sixteenth floor of the Trump International Hotel and Tower, Chicago

Coordinates: 41°53′20.3″N 87°37′35.7″W

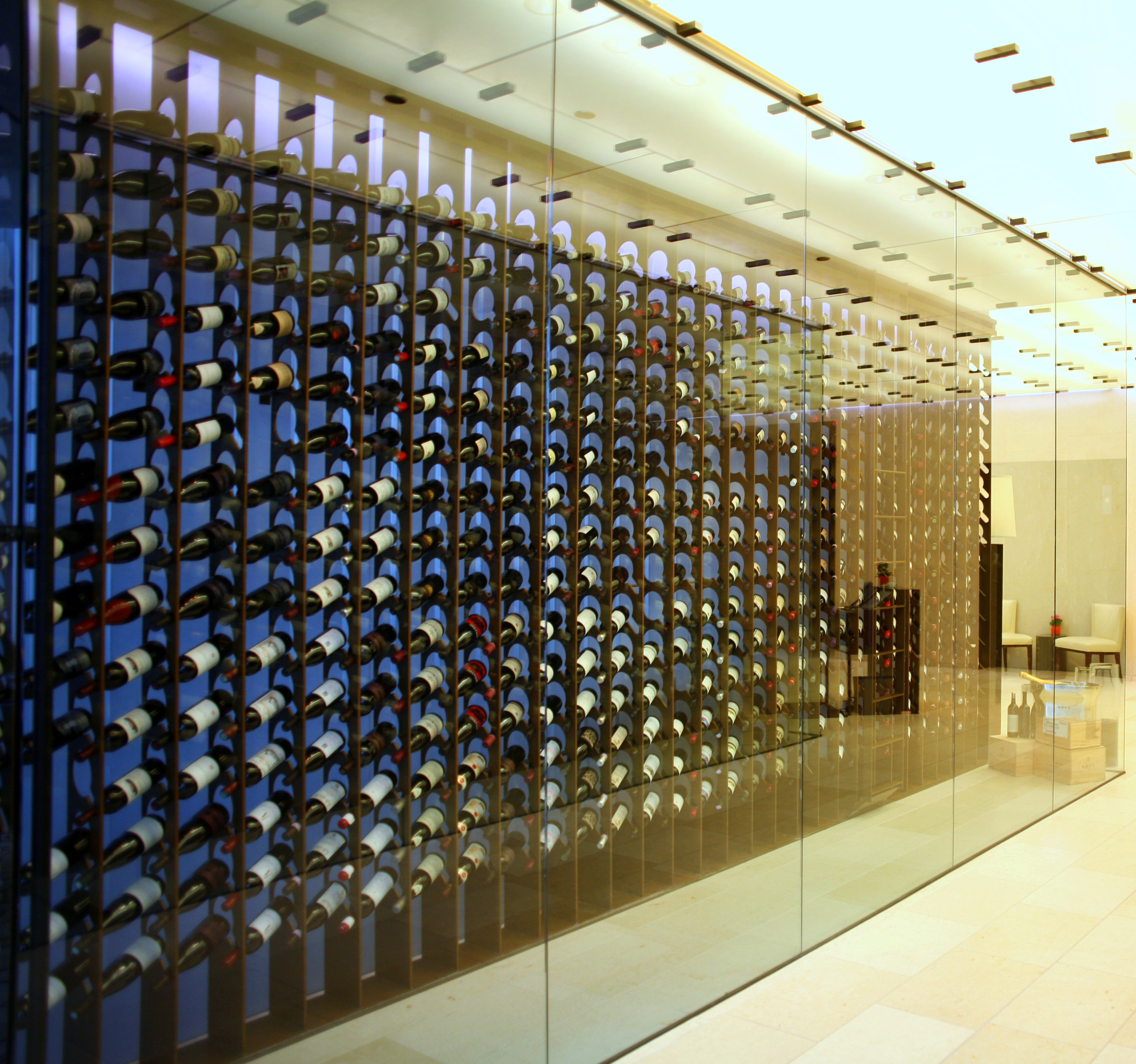
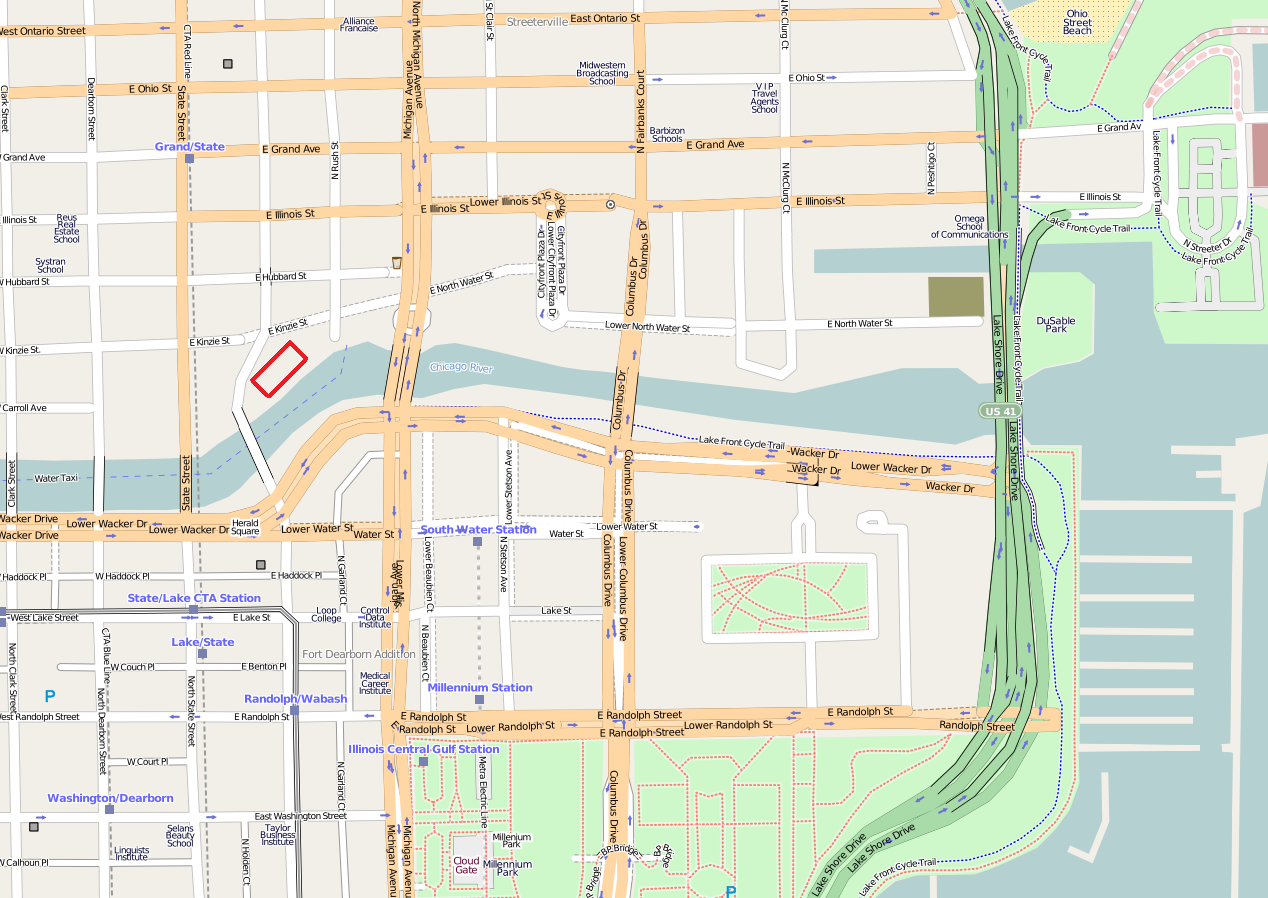
- Wine racks at Sixteen (2009) Hotel location along the Chicago River
- Interactive map of Sixteen

Restaurant information
- Established: February 2008
- Closed: April 28, 2018
- Head chef: Nick Dostal
- Food type: American cuisine
- Location: 401 N. Wabash Ave., Chicago, Illinois, 60611, United States
- Website: www.sixteenchicago.com

Sixteen was an American restaurant on the sixteenth floor of the Trump International Hotel and Tower in the Near North Side community area of Chicago. It was one of three food and dining options in the hotel's room service offering. Sixteen opened in early February 2008, and an adjoining outdoor patio terrace, named The Terrace at T, opened on June 25, 2009, following the completion of the hotel's construction.

The restaurant and its terrace were known for their views of the city. The eastward view included Lake Michigan, Chicago River, and the Wrigley Building clock tower. During the summer, the view included the seasonal semi-weekly fireworks displays over the lake from Navy Pier. The restaurant held a five-star rating, according to the Forbes Travel Guide, one of only 3 restaurants in Chicago to attain such a rating in 2015. It earned a two-star rating in the Michelin Guide, and was one of only 5 restaurants in the city to achieve a two-star or greater Michelin rating.

After more than a decade of operating, the restaurant closed at the end of April 2018. A few months later the space reopened with an American cuisine restaurant called Terrace 16.

== Details ==
=== History ===
Sixteen was designed by Joe Valerio, whose previous credits included the Garmin flagship store on the Magnificent Mile. Valerio's design had to work within spatial constraints determined by the tower's architects, Skidmore, Owings & Merrill, leaving him to deal with complications stemming from a variety of column shapes — some square, some round, and others rectangular. He was also obligated to incorporate the skyscraper's aluminum window frames and a garage for window washing equipment, which uses floor space overlooking the Chicago River. Sixteen opened in February 2008, a few weeks after the lower floors of the hotel had a partial opening, even though construction on the building had not been completed.

=== Architectural detail ===
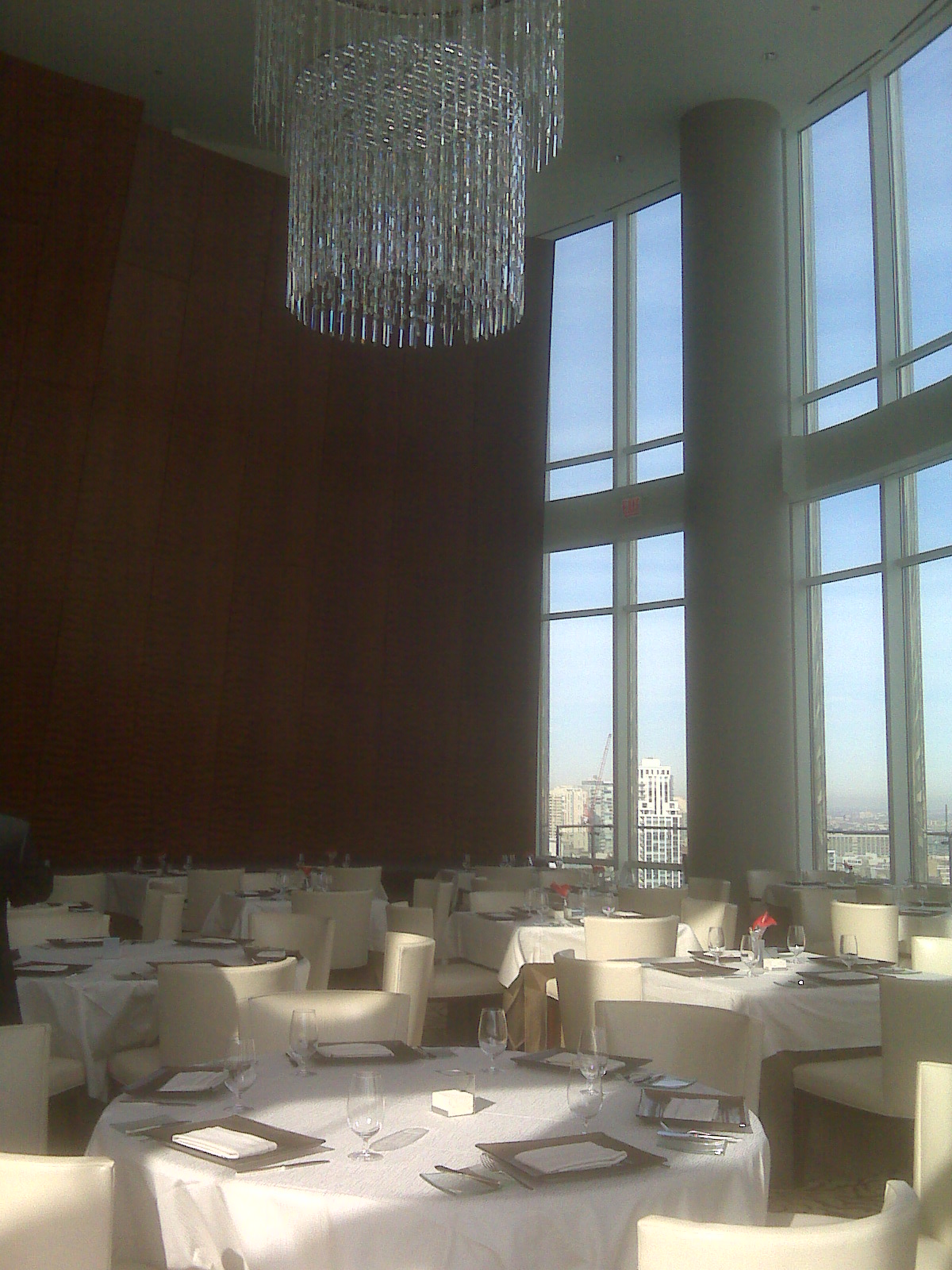
Main dining room and its chandelier

Sixteen had been described architecturally as a sequence of spaces that do not reveal themselves at once, but rather in "procession". The restaurant's foyer is T-shaped, and a passageway to the hotel is lined with floor-to-ceiling architectural bronze wine racks in opposing red and white wine rooms. The passageway leads to views—praised by Chicago Tribune Pulitzer Prize-winning architecture critic Blair Kamin—that showcase the Wrigley Building clock tower and the Tribune Tower's flying buttresses. Kamin regarded these views to be "more intimate" than the panoramic ones of the Signature Room, a restaurant near the top of the 100-story John Hancock Center. The views were described to be equally impressive by day and by night. The main part of the procession was the Tower Room, a dining room with a 30-foot (9.1 m) dome-shaped ceiling made of West African wood. The dome was furnished with Swarovski chandeliers and incorporated mirrors so that all diners can experience the view. The restaurant had two other dining rooms, named for their views: the Bridge Room and the River Room.

=== Dining ===
Sixteen was originally led by executive chef Frank Brunacci who had worked in two AAA Five Diamond establishments, Diamond Victor's at The Ritz-Carlton in New Orleans, Louisiana and The Dining Room at The Ritz-Carlton in Buckhead, Atlanta, Georgia, and also at restaurants in London and Australia. In addition to using European techniques, he relied on spices from North Africa and India. The cuisine, decor and architecture have all drawn impressive reviews. Food is available à la carte or in tasting services.

Thomas Lents was appointed executive chef of Sixteen in January 2012. Lents began his career as executive sous chef of Chicago's four-star restaurant Everest, under the direction of chefs Jean Joho and Thierry Tritsch. After a five-year tenure, he moved to Dublin, Ireland, where he worked as a sous chef at the Michelin two star-rated Thornton's Restaurant. During his time abroad, Lents staged in acclaimed kitchens, including the Michelin three star-rated Waterside Inn in Bray and Le Manoir Aux Quatres Saisons in Great Milton. Upon returning to the United States in 2007, Lents worked at the Michelin three star-rated, five-diamond Joel Robuchon at The Mansion inside MGM Grand Las Vegas, where he was quickly promoted from sous chef to executive sous chef. In 2008, he moved north to San Francisco to take the chef de cuisine position at the Michelin-rated Quince Restaurant, before Chef Joël Robuchon offered him the opportunity to be the first American to serve as chef de cuisine of his namesake restaurant. Lents holds an advanced placement culinary art degree from the New England Culinary Institute, where he studied under founding chef, Michel LeBorgne, as well as a BA in philosophy from Wabash College in Indiana.

In February 2017, Lent departed making way for his Chef de cuisine, Nick Dostal. Dostal's prior experience included stints in at Ria at the Elysian Hotel (now Waldorf Astoria Chicago), executive sous-chef at Grace Restaurant, Larkspur Restaurant in Vail, Colo., and chef de partie at San Francisco's Quince Restaurant.

== Critical review ==
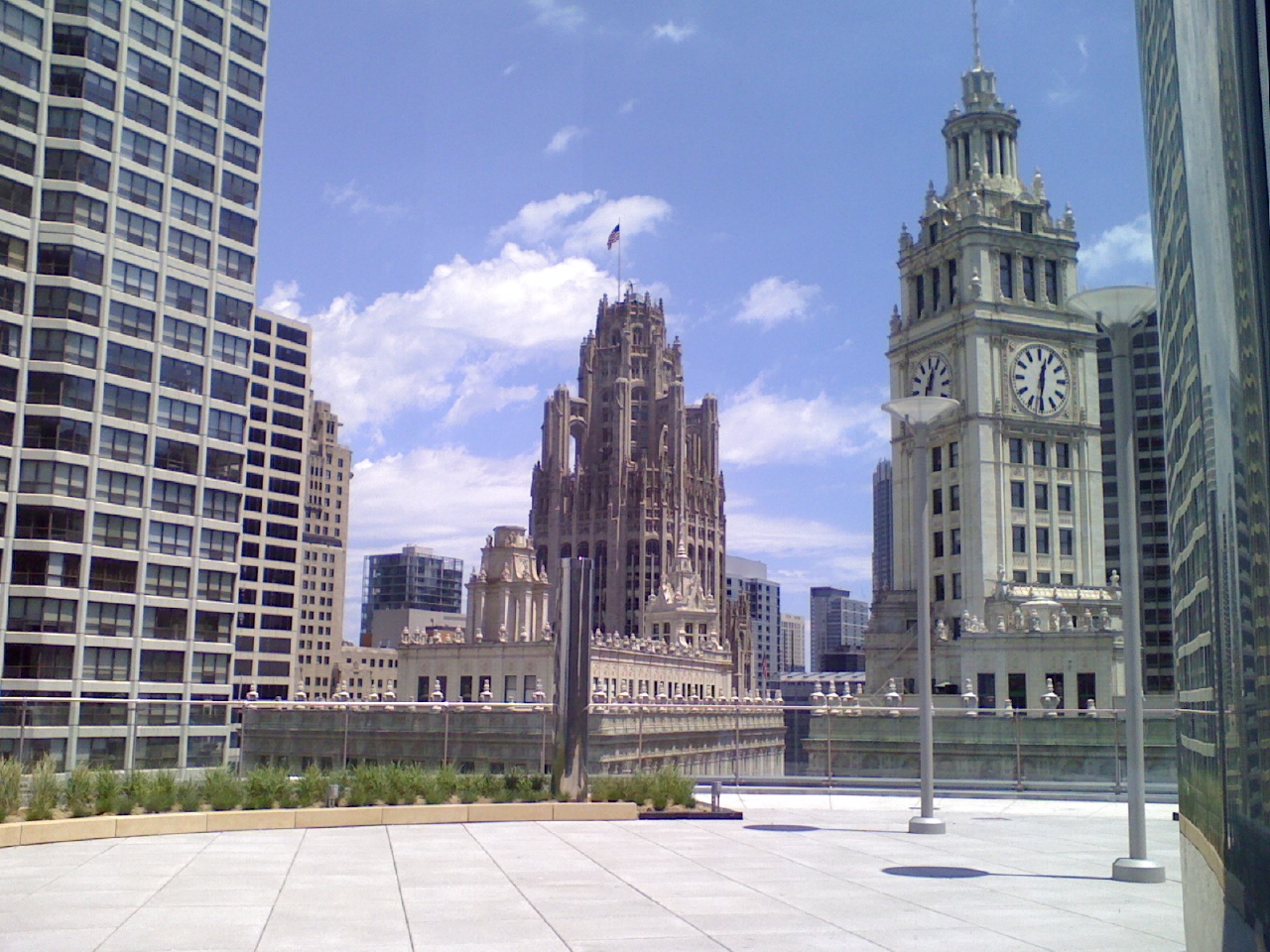
Wrigley Building clock tower and Tribune Tower from The Terrace at Trump

Fodor's called the food a "unique fusion of European and Asian flavors." According to a 2008 review from Time Out Chicago, the restaurant is more a place to impress clients and dates, rather than a top–notch dining experience with top-notch cuisine, due to its association with Donald Trump and its views. The magazine's annual Eating & Drinking guide describes the dining room as stately and impressive, the staff as attentive and professional, and the food as "well-presented." Chicago Tribune reviewer Blair Kamin noted that some e-mail correspondents considered Trump Tower the "ultimate McMansion in the sky," but at least Sixteen provided opportunity for people to emulate Guy de Maupassant, who is said to have disliked the Eiffel Tower so much that he ate at the tower's restaurant daily so as not to have to look at its monstrosity. According to the Forbes Travel Guide: 2010 City Guide: Chicago, the hotel hosted one of the seven four-star restaurants in Chicago, which had two five-star restaurants. Three years later, according to the Forbes Travel Guide: 2013 City Guide the restaurant was one of only three five-star restaurants in Chicago. It remained one of only 3 five-star Forbes-rated restaurants in the 2015 Forbes Guide (along with Alinea and Grace).

When Chicago became one of three American Michelin Guide star-rated cities in November 2010, Sixteen was one of 23 restaurants to receive at least one star for 2011. However, the following year, it lost its rating during its chef transition. Sixteen regained its one-star rating for the 2013 edition under first-year executive chef Thomas Lents. The restaurant was promoted to two-star rating by Michelin for 2014 and retained that rating in 2015. It was one of 5 Chicago restaurants to achieve at least a two-star Michelin rating in both years. In 2016 & 2017, it again retained its two-star rating as one of five restaurants in the city with such a rating. In 2018, it was one of six two-Michelin star or better restaurants in Chicago.

The restaurant was described as expensive, and one critic partly attributed the prices to Sixteen's status as a hotel restaurant. However, others felt the prices to be expected for the ambience created by the interior design, architecture, and views, despite the association with Trump. According to a Chicago Tribune critic, the prices were respectable given the overall experience.

Sixteen had a bar that Kamin complained had "negligible" views that did not justify the prices, but another raved were "pleasant."

== Related venues ==
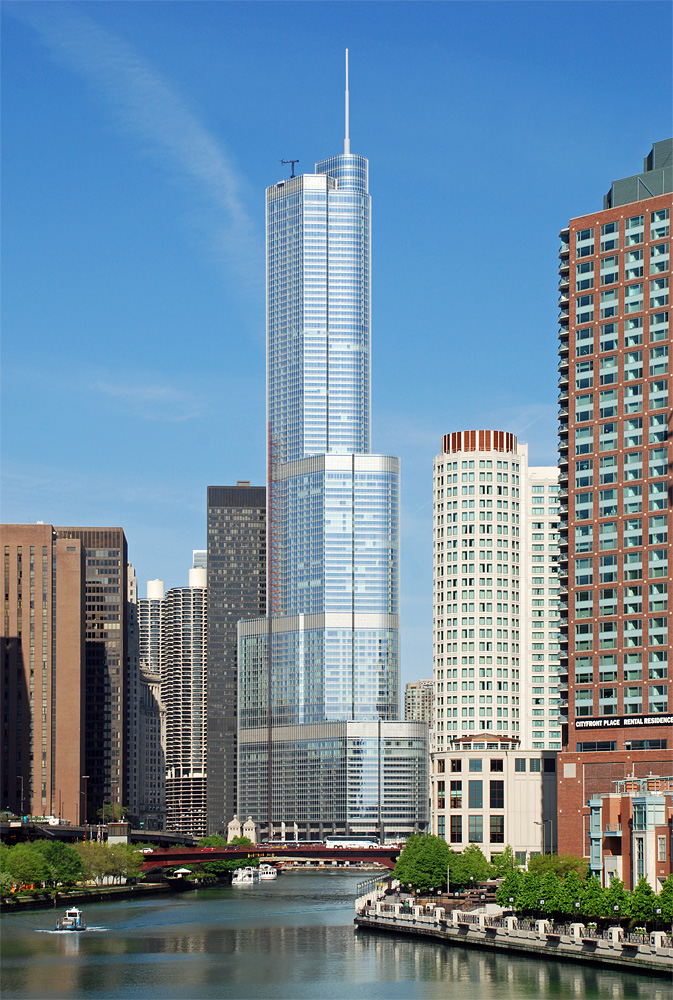
The Terrace at Trump is located adjacent to Sixteen on the first setback of the Trump International Hotel and Tower, Chicago.

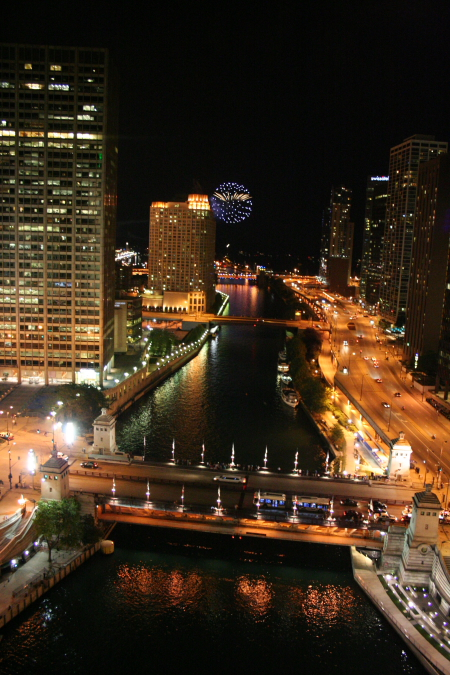
Navy Pier's fireworks over Lake Michigan beyond the Chicago River and the Michigan Avenue and Link Bridges from The Terrace at Trump

In addition to Sixteen and the traditional hotel room service dining option, Trump International Hotel and Tower, Chicago provides two other food & dining options for its guests.

=== The Terrace at Trump ===
The Terrace, opened on June 25, 2009, has views of the Chicago River and Lake Michigan as well as Navy Pier's seasonal Wednesday and Saturday evening fireworks and was designed for al fresco dining. It is located adjacent to Sixteen on the first setback of the tower, and it was part of a larger 2009 movement to supply al fresco dining options to the Chicago marketplace. The view also features a close-up of the Wrigley Building's clock tower. Although it offered a menu of appetizers and entrees, it was said to focus on serving drinks, and Time Out Chicago describes it as a posh playground for consuming cocktails. The Chicago Sun-Times praised its views and ranked it as the number one al fresco dining venue in Chicago. It was open daily afternoons and evenings, weather permitting.

=== Rebar ===
Rebar is a mezzanine-level hotel bar that opened in 2008. It describes itself as a "liquid kitchen" because it uses fresh and solid herbs, fruits, and vegetables. RedEye contributing editor David Himmel called it the best new bar to take a date to in 2008. He called it "sleek" and spoke highly of its river views. The bar was named after the reinforcing steel bars, called rebar, that support the hotel. Another RedEye critic also complimented the views and described Rebar as a cozy, hotel bar. In 2008, one member of the WMAQ-TV Street Team commended it for its signature cocktails and sushi, while another preferred to highlight its stainless steel swizzle sticks. Rebar includes a 25-person VIP room with peerless views of a hotel lobby.

== Closure and replacement ==
Sixteen shut its doors on April 28, 2018. By August 2018, Terrace 16 reopened as a more modest and casual restaurant.

== See also ==
- Les Nomades
- Charlie Trotter
- Alinea
