= Wine rack =

Equipment for the organized storage of wine bottles

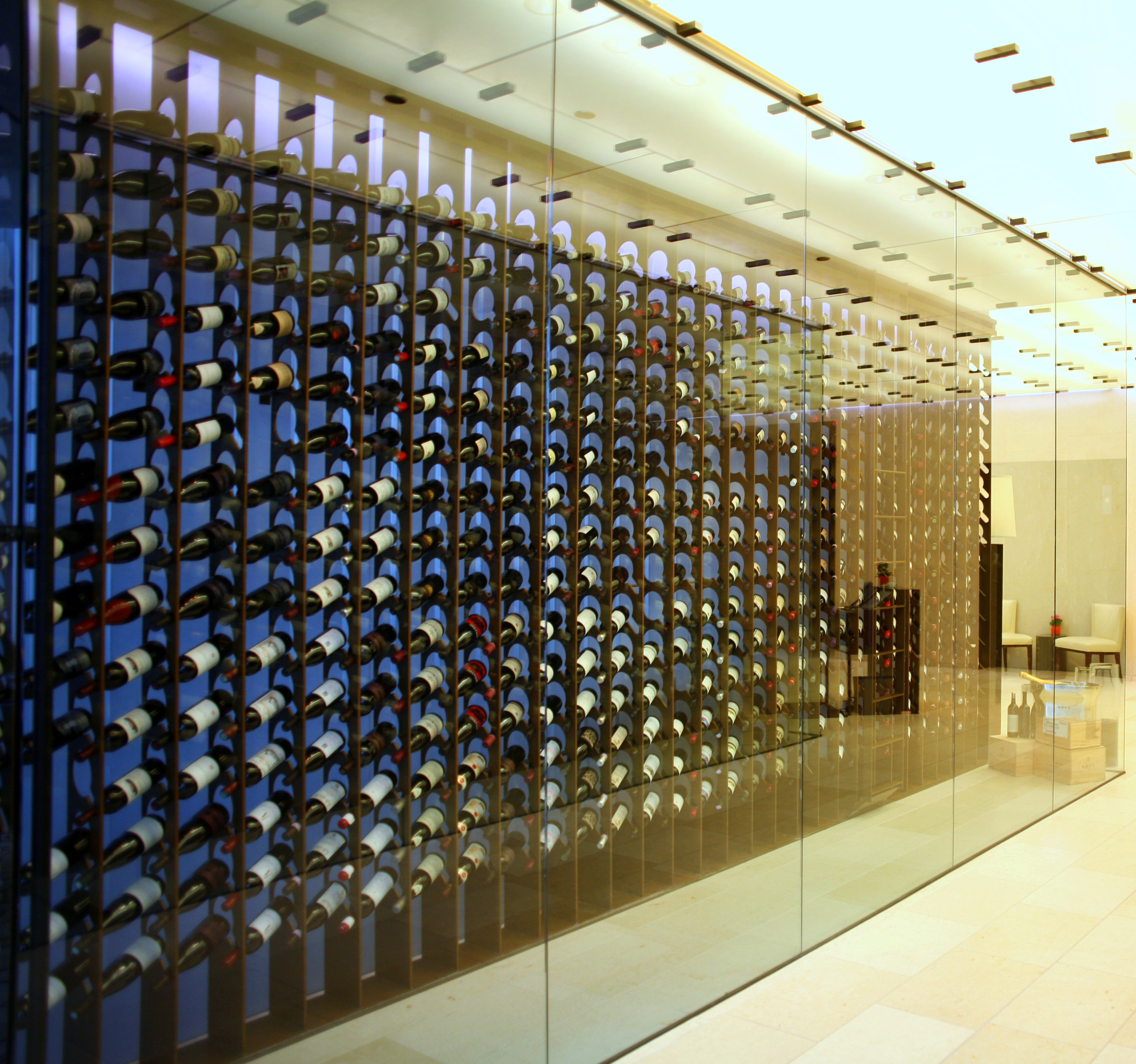
Wine racks at Trump International Hotel and Tower, Chicago's Sixteen.

A wine rack is a set of shelves for the organized storage of wine. Wine racks can be built out of a number of different materials. The size of the rack and the number of bottles it can hold can vary widely. Wine racks can be located in a winemaker's professional wine cellar as well as private homes for personal collections.

== Materials ==
=== Wood ===
Wood is the most popular medium when it comes to wine rack construction. It is easily obtainable and very workable.

Many types of wood are used. Premium Redwood, All Heart Redwood, Mahogany, Pine, Red Oak, Cedar, and Fir are just a few of the various options. Cedar is popular choice because of the aroma it gives off. This aroma is also its downfall — it can penetrate the wine via the cork. Fir is another popular choice — it also is very strong and comes in a natural cream colour.

=== Plastic ===
Plastic is the most modern material to create designer wine rack. It can be stacked to any shape.

=== Metal ===
Metal is another popular choice for wine racks. Although it is not as easy to work with as wood, metal pieces tend to have greater variety. With metal, more fluid and flowing shapes can be made, which is impossible with wood. Metal can also be painted to match any decor.

Metal racks are a good idea for both short- and long-term wine storage. There are metal wine rack options that focus on more aesthetic, minimalist design that hold fewer bottles than wood counterparts as well as metal wine rack configurations that can store the same number of bottles per square foot as the wood counterpart.

=== Stainless steel ===
Stainless steel wine racks are commonly placed in the kitchen. In fact, stainless steel wine racks have become a complementary accessory to today's modern living as with the abundance of stainless steel kitchen packages and appliances which gained favor in the modern market.

Wine racks made of stainless steel are perfect to store wine bottles in the kitchen due to the material's resistance to corrosion and staining. Stainless steel can be easily cleaned and it may also be 100% recycled. This material has the greatest resistance to oxidation and so it does not rust. Stainless steel wine racks are increasing in popularity because of their ability to maintain the quality and appearance for longer periods of time, especially in a humid space such as the kitchen.

Stainless steel wine racks are passivated in order to get a dull, mat look and electropolished with a reflective sheen, and bead blasted which leaves a texture look behind.

Stainless steel wine racks also come in a variety of shapes, designs and sizes and although they are commonly used in kitchens, they may be placed in any other room of the house. They may also be used as ornaments, for cellaring, or in commercial or industrial operation. Some double as both racks and coolers, with temperature controlled, vacuum sealed glass doors which are tinted to keep out unnecessary light and regulate temperatures .

=== Wrought iron ===
Wrought iron is a good choice for wine racks as it is durable and long lasting. There are many different styles of wrought iron wine racks manufactured, ranging from contemporary and modern to the traditional and antique. Wine racks made of this material are normally used as ornamental pieces as they come in fluid shapes and can become real pieces of art.

Wine racks made of wrought iron can store wine bottles safely at the same time with changing the look of one's home, office or bar. Many of these wine racks may be wall mounted and often they are designed as forms of sculpture.

Due to the properties that wrought iron has, wine racks that are made of this material are the most surprising and innovative in shape and design and as a result, they are often used more for decorative purposes than for storing wine. They come in various sizes and yet it is common that a wine rack made of wrought iron holds only one bottle of wine.

== Specialty Racks ==
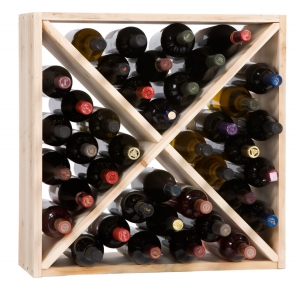
An example of a wine cube

Most wine racks are constructed to hold the standard 750 ml bottles. To hold oversize or different shaped bottles special wine racks needs to be constructed.

Wine racks have increased in popularity among the wine consumers and, therefore wine racks manufacturers have come up with more daring and innovative designs, shapes and functionality of these furniture pieces. Many buyers use wine racks as pieces of ornament and not only as a storage method. Hence, the industry of wine racks has developed, bringing more wine racks with improved functionality.

=== Wine glass rack ===
Many wine rack manufacturers include a wine glass rack in their final product. This makes it possible and aesthetic to store both wine bottles and glasses in the same place. There is a wide variety of products build this way, and as they are made of different materials they may be placed in all rooms of the house, office or bars.

The wine glass racks come in different shapes and designs and they can be hanging or wall mounted or they can take the shape of a wine cabinet.

=== Wall mounted racks ===
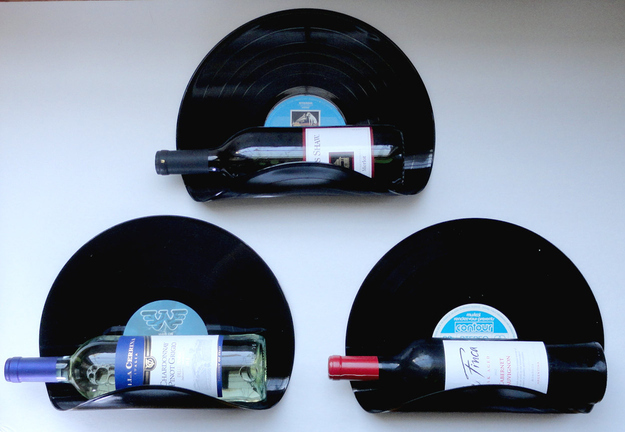
Wall mounted vinyl record wine rack

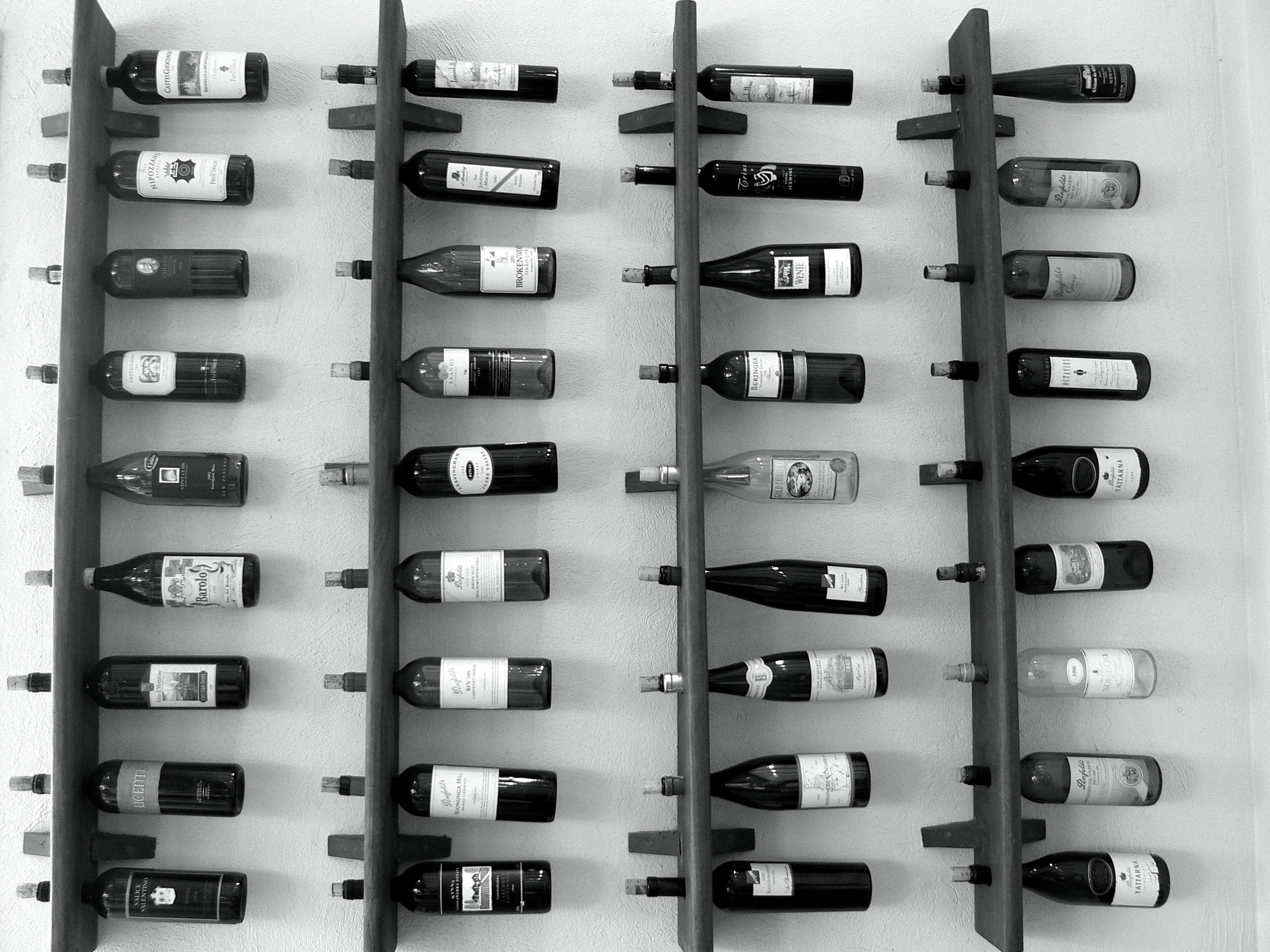
A wall mounted wooden wine rack

These are the wine racks that can be placed on the wall. They can be made of different materials, including wood and metal and they come in various shapes and designs that will fit any decor. The wall mounted wine racks are great space savers and are typically used for decoration and not for wine storage. They generally hold only one or just few bottles of wine since their main purpose is to give elegance to a certain space. The wall mounted wine racks may also have wine glass racks incorporated.

=== Big bottle ===
To accommodate wine bottles that are larger than the norm, big bottle wine racks must be used. The construction of these racks must be stronger because of the added weight. Usually regular bottles can be put on these wine racks as well.

=== Cubes ===
Wine cubes are a versatile type of wine storage. Since you just stack bottles on top of each other, any type of bottle can be stored. This is convenient if many different types of bottles are being used. These cubes are small but can fit a large number of bottles.

== See also ==
- Racking
