= Trump International Hotel and Tower (Chicago) =

Skyscraper in Chicago, Illinois, United States

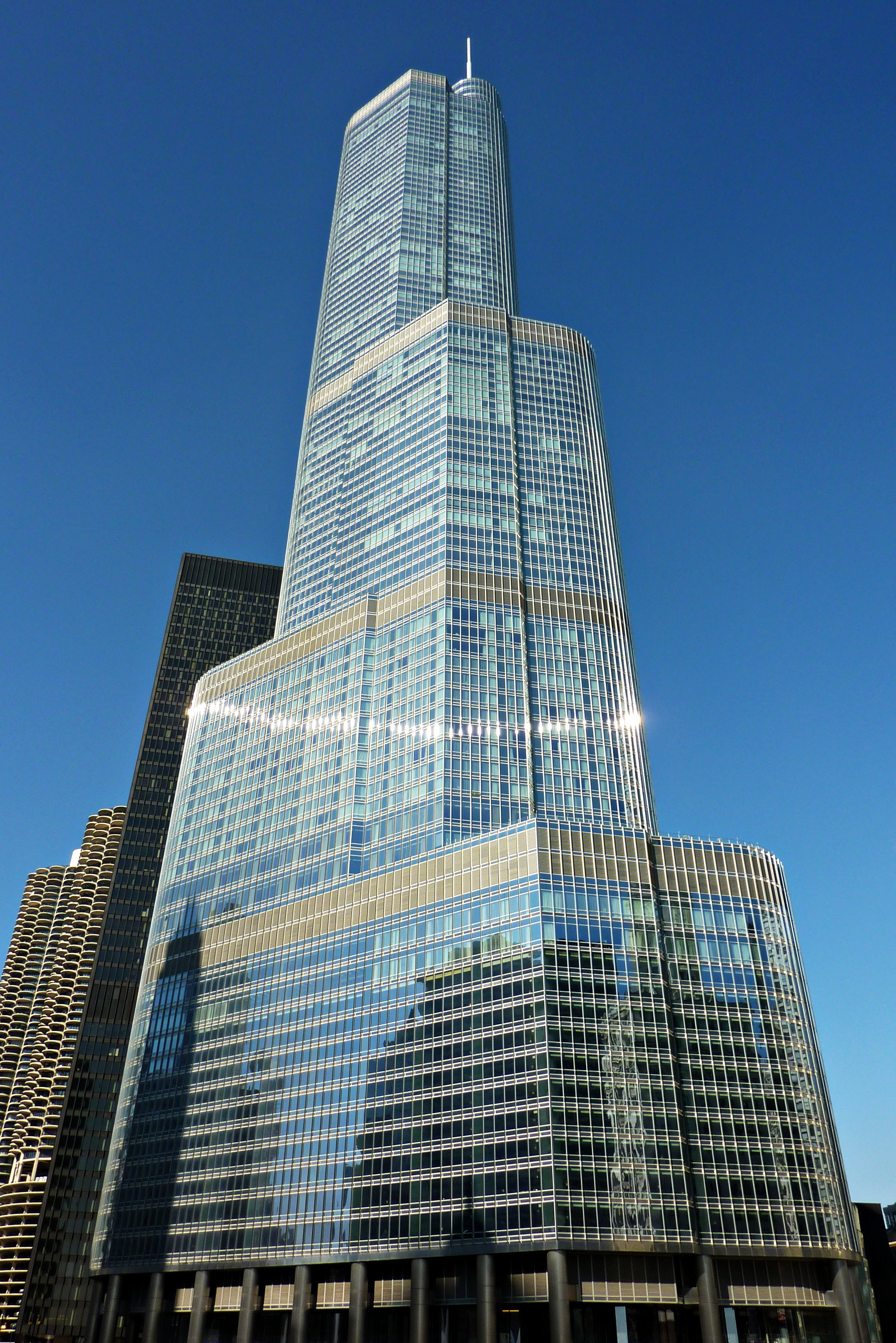
- Trump International Hotel and Tower in 2010

General information
- Status: Completed
- Type: Condo-hotel
- Architectural style: Modern
- Location: 401 North Wabash Avenue, Chicago, Illinois, U.S.
- Coordinates: 41°53′20″N 87°37′35″W
- Construction started: March 17, 2005
- Completed: January 3, 2009
- Opening: January 30, 2009
- Cost: $847 million

Height
- Antenna spire: 1,388 feet (423.1 m)
- Roof: 1,171 feet (356.9 m)
- Top floor: 98

Technical details
- Floor count: 98
- Floor area: 2.6 million square feet (240,000 m^{2})
- Lifts/elevators: 27

Design and construction
- Architect: Adrian Smith
- Developer: Donald Trump
- Structural engineer: William F. Baker
- Main contractor: Bovis Lend Lease

Website
- Official website

The Trump International Hotel and Tower, or simply the Trump Tower, is a skyscraper condo-hotel in the Near North Side community area in downtown Chicago, Illinois, United States. The building, named for Donald Trump, was designed by architect Adrian Smith of Skidmore, Owings and Merrill. Bovis Lend Lease built the 100-story structure between 2005 and 2009, which reaches a height of 1,388 feet (423.2 m) including its spire, its roof topping out at 1,169 feet (356 m). It is next to the main branch of the Chicago River, with a view of the entry to Lake Michigan beyond a series of bridges over the river. The building received publicity when the winner of the first season of The Apprentice reality television show, Bill Rancic, chose to manage the construction of the tower over managing a Rancho Palos Verdes–based Trump National Golf Course & Resort in the Los Angeles metro area.

Donald Trump announced in 2001 that the skyscraper would become the tallest building in the world, but after the September 11 attacks that same year, the architects scaled back the building's plans, and its design underwent several revisions. When topped out in 2009, it became the second-tallest building in the U.S. It surpassed the city's John Hancock Center as the building with the highest residence (apartment or condo) in the world, and briefly held this title until the completion of the Burj Khalifa.

The design of the building includes, from the ground up, retail space, a parking garage, a hotel and condominiums. The 339-room hotel opened for business with limited accommodations and services on January 30, 2008, then full accommodation and services on April 28. The building was topped out in late 2008 and construction was completed in 2009. In 2024, following a six-year lawsuit, the Trump Tower's cooling water intake system was ruled to be in violation of state environmental laws that protect the Chicago River by creating and operating "a public nuisance in violation of Illinois law".

== Location ==
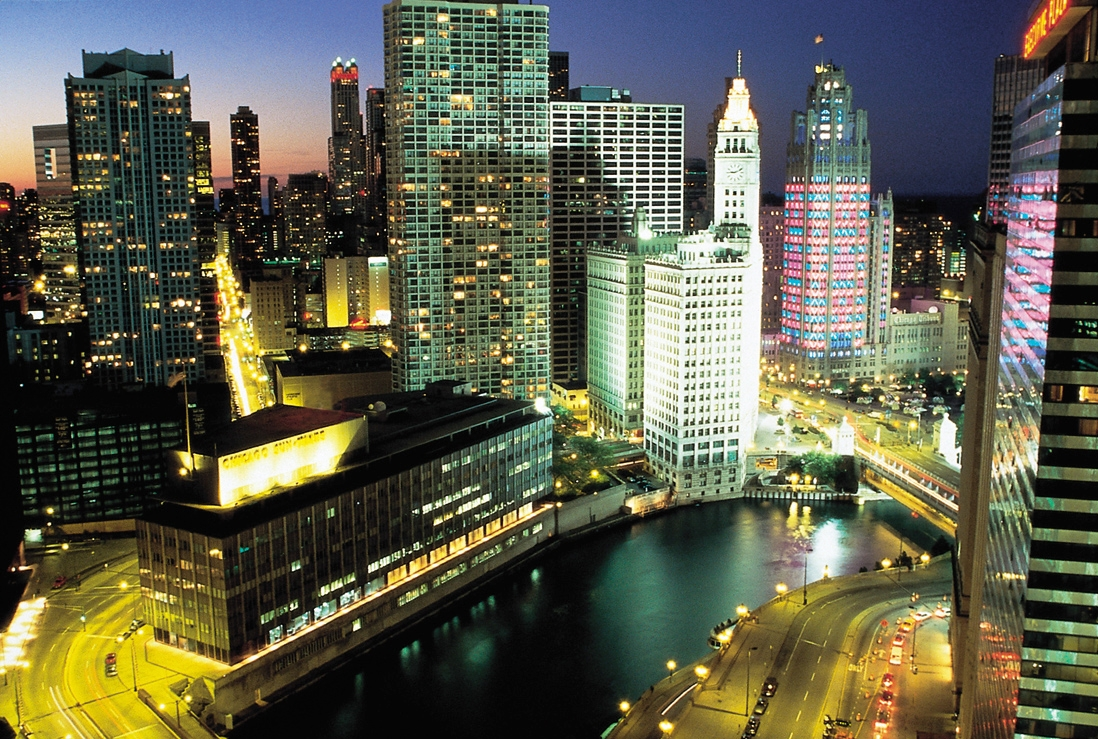
The site of the tower was occupied by the former Chicago Sun-Times building (low-rise building at left).

The tower sits at 401 North Wabash Avenue in the River North Gallery District, part of the Near North Side community area of Chicago. The building occupies the site vacated by the Chicago Sun-Times, one of the city's two major newspapers, and its location within the River North Gallery District places it in a neighborhood that has had a high concentration of art galleries since the 1980s. The site, at the foot of Rush Street, is on the north side of the Chicago River just west of the Wrigley Building and the Michigan Avenue Bridge, and just east of Marina City and 330 North Wabash. The building is close to numerous Chicago landmarks; it borders the Michigan-Wacker District, which is a Registered Historic District. Parts of the building are visible throughout the city, and the entire length of the building is visible from boats on the river, as well as from locations to the east along the river, such as the mouth of Lake Michigan, the Lake Shore Drive Overpass, and the Columbus Drive Bridge.

The building is across the Chicago River from the Chicago Loop, the city's business district. It is a block away from the southern end of the Magnificent Mile portion of Michigan Avenue. The restaurant, Terrace 16, has a clear view of the Chicago River's entrance to Lake Michigan and of the four buildings completed in the 1920s that flank the Michigan Avenue Bridge (Wrigley Building, Tribune Tower, 333 North Michigan, and 360 North Michigan).

== Design and architecture ==
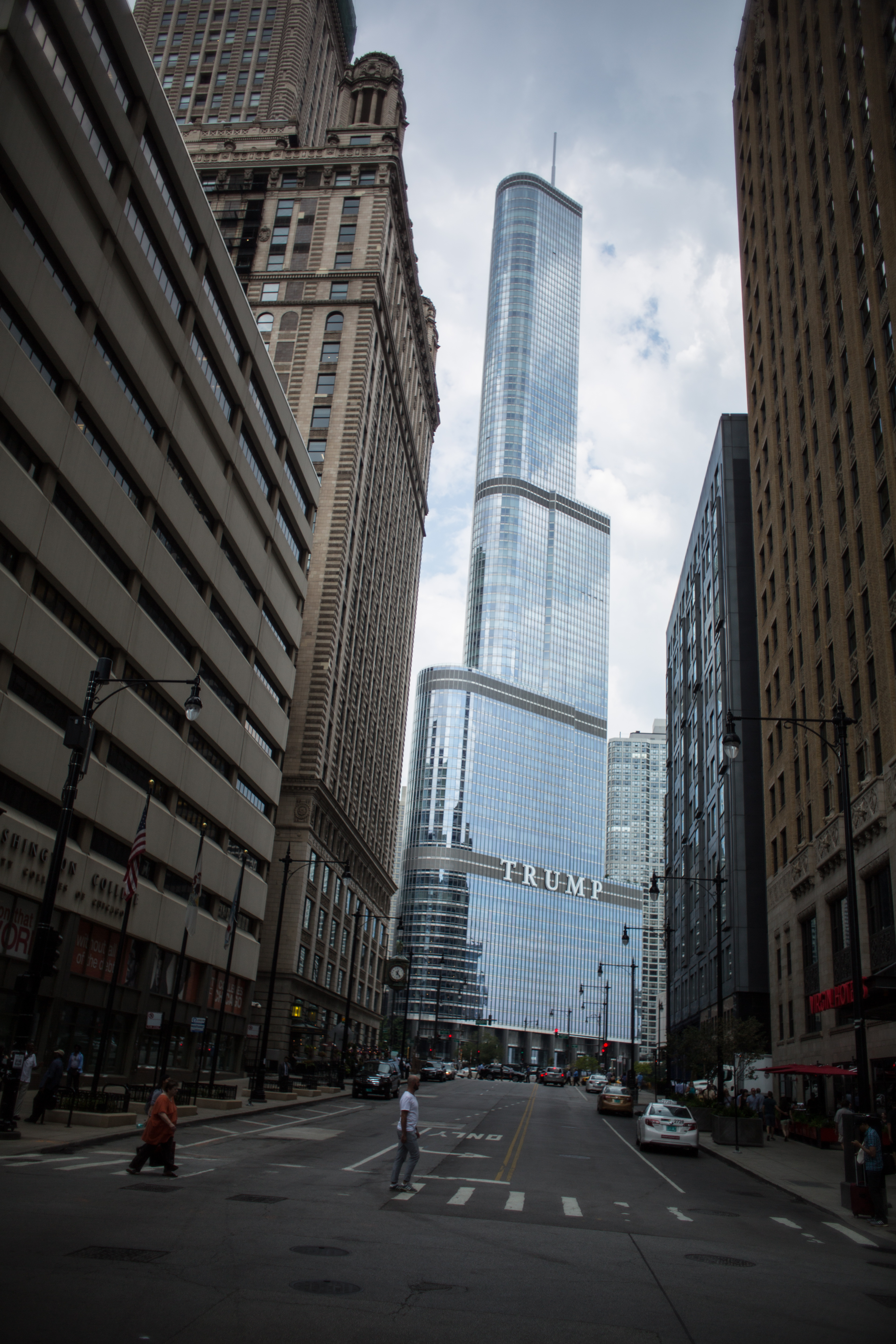
Trump Tower from ground level

The design of the building incorporates three setback features designed to provide visual continuity with the surrounding skyline, each reflecting the height of a nearby building. The first setback, on the east side of the building, aligns with the cornice line of the Wrigley Building to the east; the second, on the west side, aligns with River Plaza to the north and with the Marina City Towers to the west. The third setback, on the east side, relates to 330 North Wabash building (formerly known as IBM Plaza). However, some views distort the alignment of the second setback. (Note: Viewing the building from the east (along the Chicago River, e.g.), one sees that the Marina City towers beyond the Trump International Hotel and Tower do not line up with the second setback.) The setbacks and rounded edges of the building combat vortex formation. The body of the building is raised 30 feet (9.1 m) above the main Wabash entrance and 70 feet (21 m) above the Chicago River. The building's Permasteelisa curtain wall uses clear low-emissivity coated glass and a curved wing-shaped polished stainless-steel mullion system that projects 9 inches (23 cm) from the glass line. It incorporates brushed stainless steel spandrel panels and clear anodized aluminum.

The building has 2.6 million square feet (240,000 m^{2}) of floor space, rises to 98 stories, and houses 486 luxury residential condominiums. These include studio apartments, a mixture of suites with one to four bedrooms, and five-bedroom penthouses. The tower also features a luxury hotel condominium with 339 guest rooms. The building includes, from the ground up, retail space, a parking garage, a hotel, and condominiums. The 3rd through 12th floors house lobbies, retail space, and the parking garage; the 14th floor and its mezzanine hosts a health club and spa. The 17th floor through the 27th-floor mezzanine contain hotel condominiums and executive lounges. The 28th through 85th floors have residential condominiums, and the 86th through 89th floors have penthouses. A 1.2-acre (0.49 ha) riverfront park and riverwalk, along a 500-foot (150 m) space in the area adjacent to the building to the east, was opened in the first half of 2010. The park facilitates public assembly and entertainment activity while linking the building effectively with river commuters.

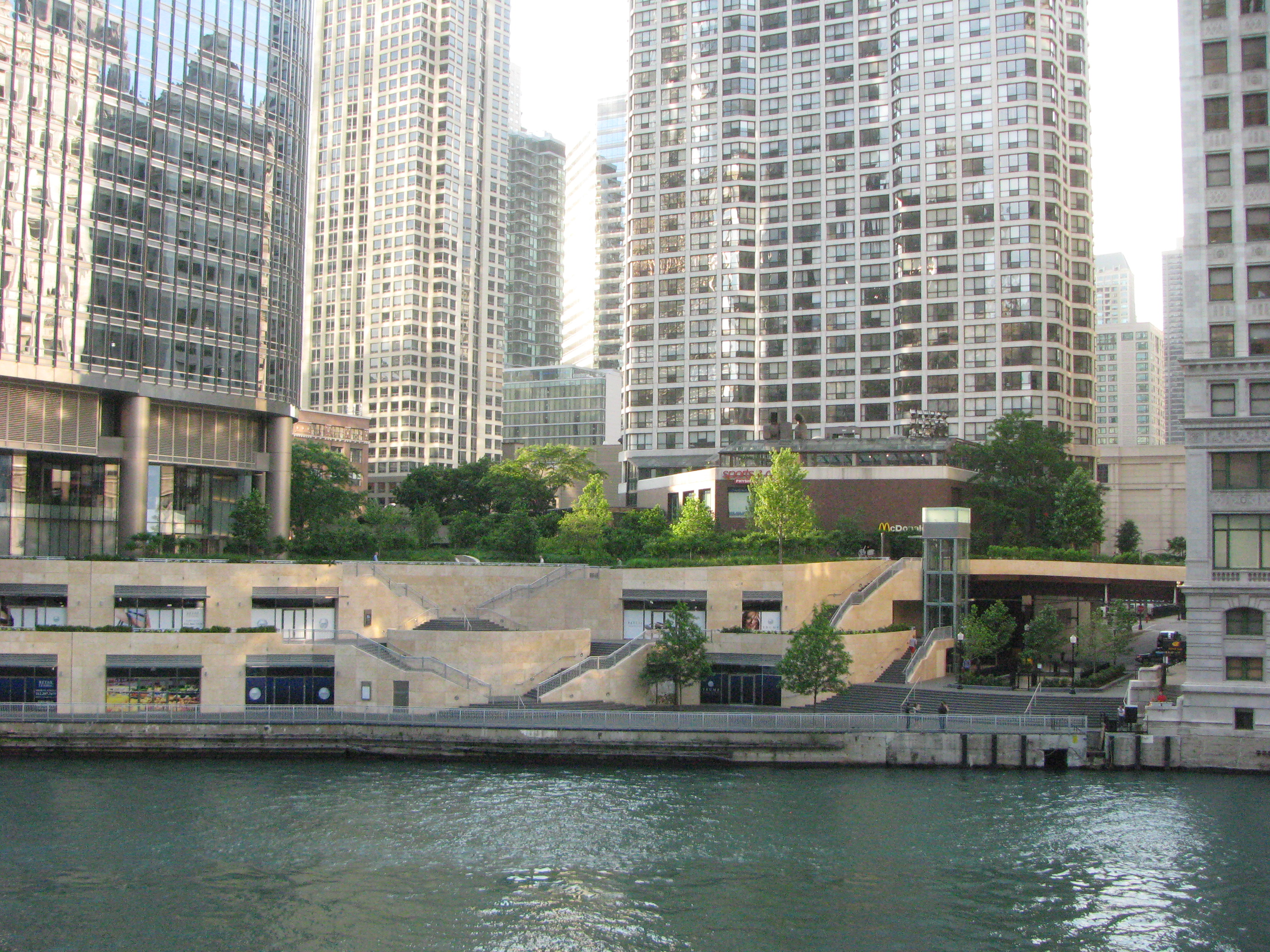
The 1.2-acre (0.49 ha) riverfront park and riverwalk runs between Wrigley Building (right) and the hotel (left) at the foot of Rush Street.

In 2011, the riverfront park landscaping surrounding the building, which is referred to as Trump Plaza and Riverwalk or sometimes just Trump Plaza, became the subject of controversy. In 2010, the Plaza had earned special recognition at the Mayor Richard M. Daley's Landscape Awards. The press release noted the landscaping "for their magnificent new civic landscape that is a poetic interpretation of native Illinois that seems at once sophisticated and familiar." However, in 2011, the award-winning plantings of small sumac trees, ferns and native grasses with yellow, orange and red hues were removed and replaced with evergreens like junipers and boxwoods, pieces of gray stone, and purple perennials (catmint and salvia), which may require less watering. To add to the controversy, the planting was accompanied by a plan to light the trees to attract nighttime park visitors, in conflict with the "dark skies" movement to reduce light pollution to facilitate better stargazing.

The building broke the record for the world's highest residence above ground level, held since 1969 by the nearby John Hancock Center. Because the Trump Tower has both hotel condominiums and residential condominiums, it did not contest for the record for the tallest residential building in the world.

=== Height ===
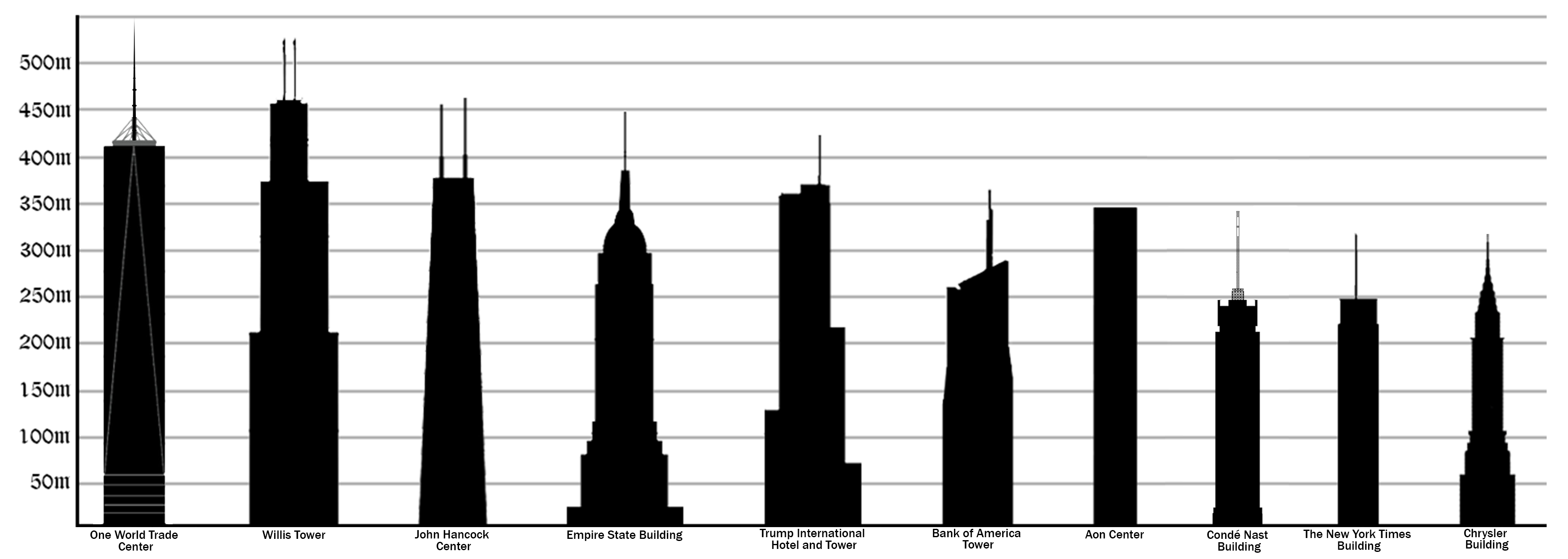
Trump International Hotel and Tower compared with other tall buildings in the US (by pinnacle height)

The Trump International Hotel and Tower rises 1,400 feet (426.7 m) from the building's main entrance on Wabash Avenue to the tip of the architectural spire. Upon its completion in 2009, the building became the seventh-tallest building in the world, behind the 1,380-foot (420.6 m) Jin Mao Tower in Shanghai, People's Republic of China. On November 17, 2009, however, the Council on Tall Buildings and Urban Habitat (CTBUH), which composes rankings of the tallest skyscrapers in the world based on various criteria, changed its standard for measuring a building's height. Prior to this change, a building's architectural height was calculated from the main entrance to the tip of the spire; new standards measured from the lowest open-air pedestrian level of a building. As the Trump International Hotel and Tower has a riverwalk entrance and pedestrian level 27 feet (8.2 m) below the building's Wabash Avenue entrance, the skyscraper's official height was recalculated as 1,388 feet (423.2 m) without a physical addition to the structure. According to the CTBUH, the recalculated height also made the tower the sixth-tallest building in the world, surpassing the Jin Mao Tower by 9 feet (2.7 m). In January 2010, the building moved back to its position as seventh-tallest with the opening of the 828-metre (2,717 ft) Burj Khalifa in Dubai.

=== Sign ===
The Trump International Hotel and Tower sign
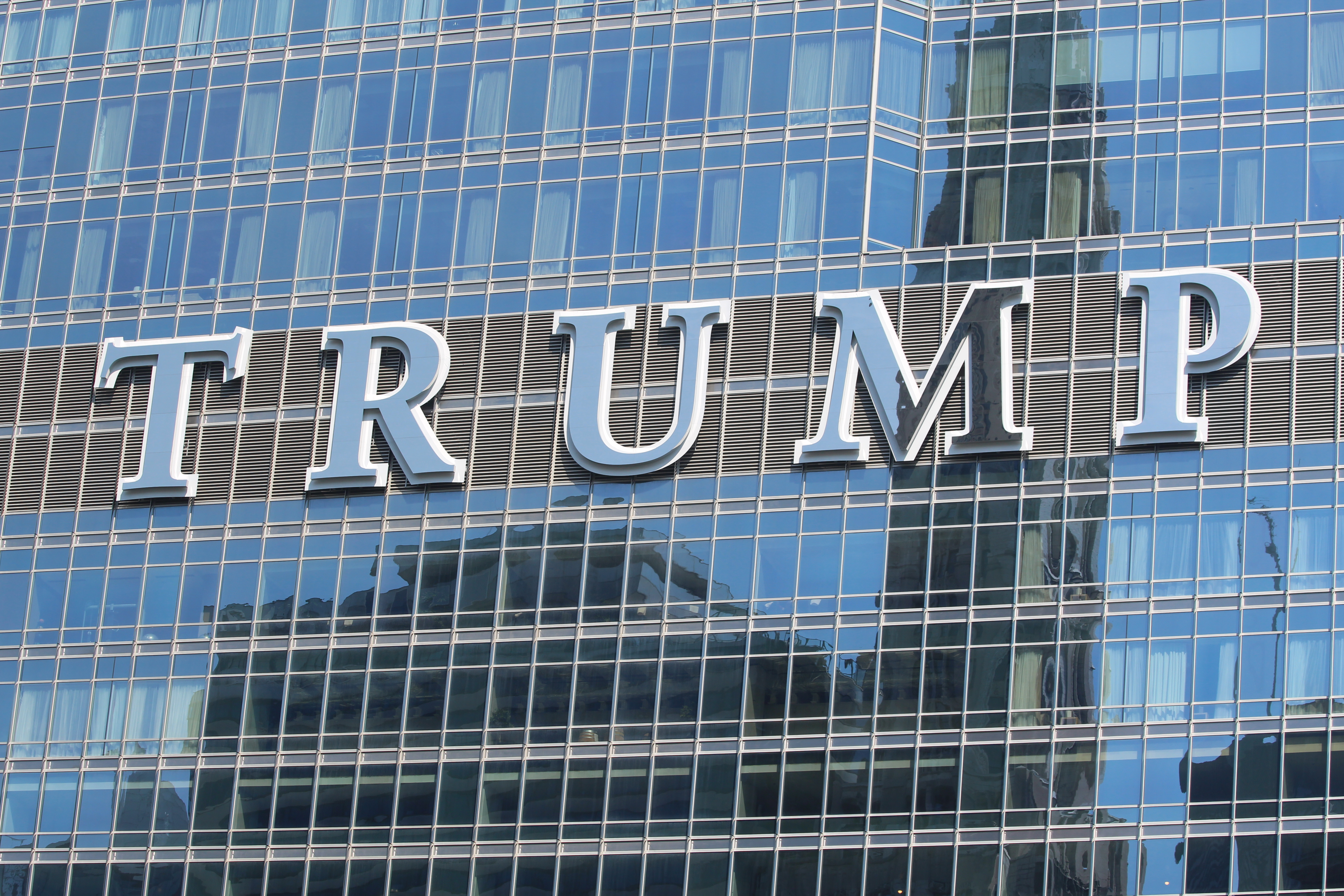
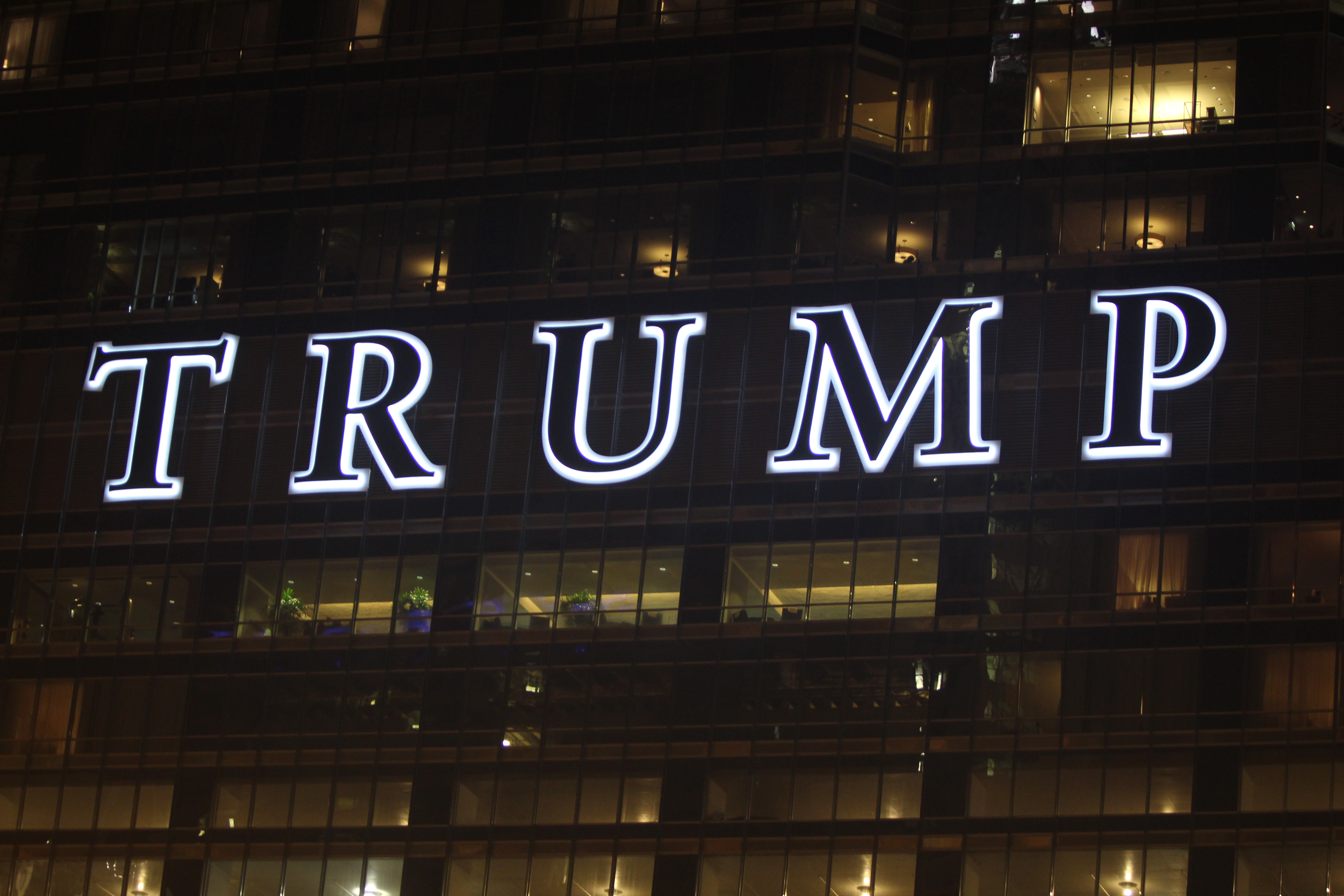

According to Trump, he received approval for a 3,600-square-foot (334.5 m^{2}) sign from Chicago Mayor Richard M. Daley's administration in 2009, but renegotiated with Mayor Rahm Emanuel's administration. In October 2013, Trump received approval to erect 20-foot-tall (6.1 m) stainless steel letters back-lit with white LED lighting spelling out TRUMP on the 16th floor of the building. He made his impending plans for the sign public in February 2014. According to a city planning department spokesperson, standard protocol for such a sign is to require approval from the local alderman (Brendan Reilly, 42nd ward) and the full Chicago City Council. The five letters span a width of approximately 141 feet (43 m), making the final approved version approximately 2,800–2,891 square feet (260.1–268.6 m^{2}), according to some sources – rather than the originally proposed size. The sign is about 200 feet (61 m) above ground level.

Crews began hanging the sign in May 2014. When Chicago Tribune architecture critic Kamin warned Trump that his review of the sign would be unfavorable, Trump responded "As time passes, it'll be like the Hollywood Sign"; architect Smith distanced himself from the sign saying "Just for the record, I had nothing to do with this sign!" The controversy surrounding the sign drew attention in the national press and international press as it neared completion and the Associated Press ran a story about Mayor Emanuel's disapproval in mid-June. According to the Mayor's spokeswoman Kelley Quinn, "Mayor Emanuel believes this is an architecturally tasteful building scarred by an architecturally tasteless sign". Kamin has noted that part of the problem is the architectural traditions of the city: "If this sign was in Atlantic City or Las Vegas, nobody would care—but it is in Chicago, and in a part of Chicago full of great buildings from the 1920s to the 1960s and onward". Trump and Reilly both pointed out how unbecoming the prior Chicago Sun-Times building signage was. As a result of the fiasco, Emanuel initiated a study on how to alter the rules to avert similar signage controversies in the future. A Chicago-based design firm planned to create and float four giant pig balloons in front of the sign as a protest, but were unsuccessful getting US Coast Guard and Chicago Department of Transportation approvals.

In the wake of the January 6 United States Capitol attack, city alderman Gilbert Villegas proposed a new ordinance that would prevent any renewal of sign permits to persons convicted of "treason, sedition or subversive activities", specifically targeting the sign.

== Features ==
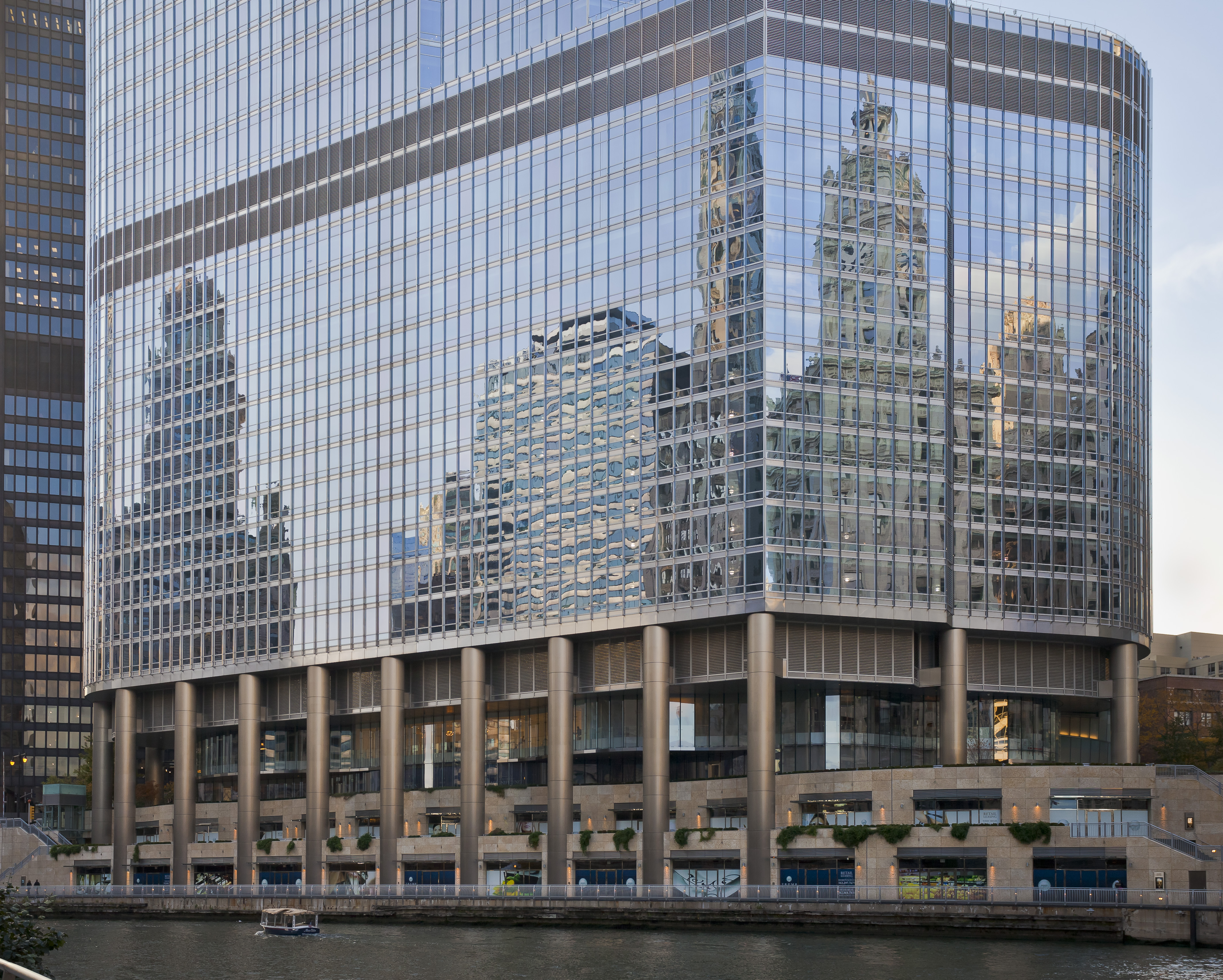
Reflection of Chicago River's skyline on the Trump International Hotel and Tower

According to the "2010 City Guide: Chicago" edition of the Forbes Travel Guide, the building hosts one of the seven four-star restaurants in the city and one of the three four-star spas. The hotel is one of two four star hotels. In 2010, Chicago had two five-star hotels and two five-star restaurants. By the time of the Forbes Travel Guide: 2013 City Guide, the hotel and restaurant were each among only three five-star ratings in the city. It retained this ranking in the 2015 Forbes Guide (along with hotels The Peninsula and Four Seasons and with restaurants Alinea and Grace). The spa was among 6 four- or five-star Forbes-rated spas in the Chicago area in 2015.

The restaurant was promoted to two-star rating by the Michelin Guide for 2014 and retained that rating in 2015. It was one of 5 Chicago restaurants to achieve at least a two-star Michelin rating in both years. In 2016, it again retained its two-star rating as one of five restaurants in the city with such a rating.

=== Hotel ===
The original plan was to have a partial opening of three of the hotel's floors on December 3, 2007, with a grand opening to follow. The interim ceremony, however, was delayed until January 30, 2008, while the City of Chicago granted occupancy approval for the staff of the hotel in the first 27 floors. Four floors of guest rooms were opened, comprising 125 of the planned 339 rooms. By January 30, construction on the exterior of the building had passed the 53rd floor. The grand opening of the hotel, including amenities, originally scheduled for March 17, 2008, took place on April 28, 2008. Pulitzer-Prize-winning Chicago Tribune architecture critic Blair Kamin faults the zebrawood paneling in the hotel lobby, but another Tribune reporter praises the hotel for its "understated, contemporary look, distinguished by stunning views".

=== Restaurants ===
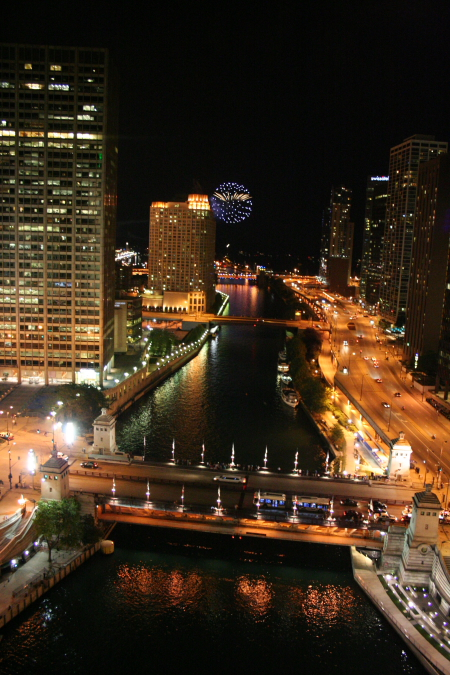
A view of Navy Pier's fireworks over Lake Michigan beyond the Chicago River as seen from Sixteen

On the 16th floor, a restaurant named Sixteen opened in early February 2008, and an outdoor patio terrace, named The Terrace at Trump, opened on June 25, 2009, following the completion of construction. The restaurant opened to favorable reviews for its cuisine, decor, location, architecture, and view. Sixteen, which was designed by Joe Valerio, is described architecturally as a sequence of spaces that do not reveal themselves at once, but rather in "procession". The restaurant's foyer is T-shaped, and a passageway to the hotel is lined with floor-to-ceiling architectural bronze wine racks in opposing red and white wine rooms. The passageway leads to views—praised by Kamin—that showcase the Wrigley Building clock tower and the Tribune Tower's flying buttresses. Kamin notes that these views are "more intimate" than the panoramic ones of the Signature Room, a restaurant near the top of the Hancock Center. The views are described as equally impressive by day and by night. The main part of the procession is the Tower Room, a dining room with a 30-foot (9.1 m) dome-shaped ceiling made of West African wood. The dome is furnished with Swarovski chandeliers and incorporates mirrors so that all diners can experience the view.

The Terrace, which opened on June 25, 2009, has views of the Chicago River and Lake Michigan as well as Navy Pier's seasonal Wednesday and Saturday evening fireworks, and was designed for outdoor or "al fresco" dining.

Rebar—the hotel bar on the mezzanine level—opened on April 18, 2008.

On June 5, 2018, it was announced that Terrace 16 Restaurant & Bar would replace Sixteen. The newly themed dining space was expected to debut during the summer of 2018.

=== Spa ===
The 23,000-square-foot (2,100 m^{2}) spa, named The Spa at Trump, opened in late March 2008. The spa offers gemstone-infused (diamond, ruby, or sapphire) oil massages, hydrating masques, exfoliating salts and the "Deluge shower". The spa features a health club with an indoor pool, eleven treatment rooms, a private couples treatment suite, Swiss shower, and saunas. The Citysearch editorial review described this as the "Bentley of hotel spas". A Chicago Tribune critic spoke of the spa in positive terms for both the treatment and the physical spa itself. The Spa at Trump can be accessed from a large circular staircase inside the hotel, enabling its customers to access the facility from specially designed spa guest rooms without using the elevator.

== Development ==
=== Design history ===
View from the south

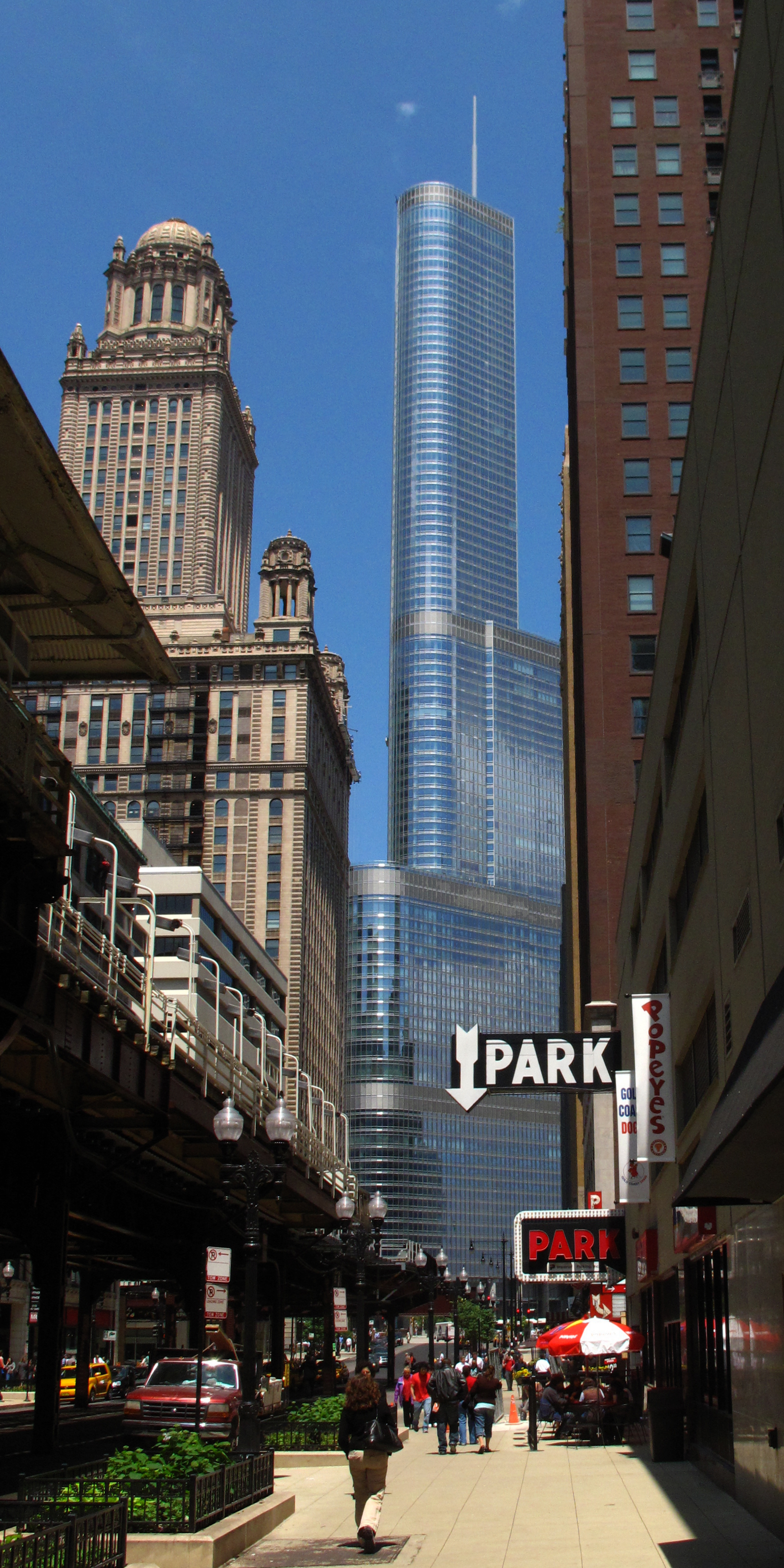
Chicago 'L' tracks, 35 East Wacker, and Trump International Hotel and Tower from Wabash Avenue in the Chicago Loop

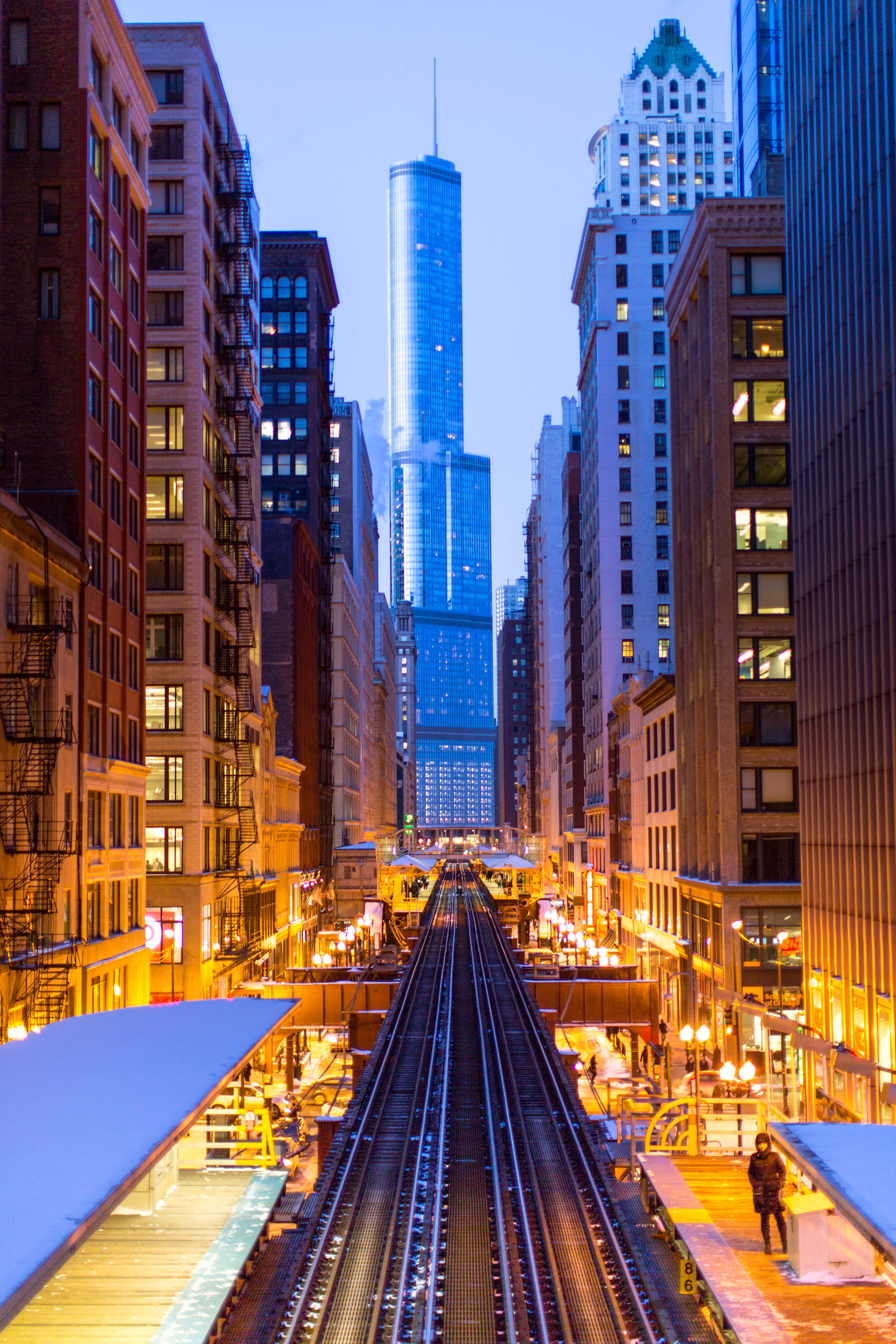
Trump Tower as seen from the overpass at Adams/Wabash station

In July 2001, when Donald Trump announced plans for the site of the former seven-story Sun-Times Building, the tower was expected to reach a height of 1,500 feet (457.2 m), which would have made it the world's tallest building. It was expected to contain between 2.4 and 3.1 million sq ft (220,000 and 290,000 m^{2}) of floor space and cost about $77 million just for the property rights. Three architectural firms were considered: Lohan Associates, Kohn Pedersen Fox Associates, and Skidmore, Owings and Merrill; Trump selected Skidmore, Owings and Merrill in August 2001. Adrian Smith, who had previously designed the Jin Mao Tower, headed the SOM team, giving Chicago a third skyscraper from the same firm which had previously designed the Willis Tower and the Hancock Center.

After the terrorist acts of September 11, 2001, Trump reduced the planned height to 78 stories and 1,073 feet (327.1 m), to reduce the risk of similar attacks. Time magazine reported that a meeting between Smith and Trump about erecting the tallest building in Chicago was taking place at the actual time of the attacks. Some international news sources later claimed that the planned tower height was reduced to 900 feet (274.3 m) after the original plans called for a 150-story building that would reach 2,000 feet (609.6 m). These claims are supported by computer renderings from 1999 of the proposed skyscraper, shown in the Chicago Tribune in 2005.

The building's 1,073-foot (327.1 m) design was first released in December 2001. However, the first design did not meet with approval from other architects, or from the residents of Chicago. A subsequent revision in July 2002 resulted in an 86-floor design for use as an office and residential structure, similar to the 2006 design which is, however, for a different combination of uses. Smith's 2002 plans put broadcast antennas (multiple communications dishes) at the top of the building. A revised 90-story, 1,125 feet (342.9 m) plan was unveiled in September 2003 for a building including condominiums, office space, a "condominium hotel", retail stores, and restaurants. In January 2004, another revision changed floors 17 through 26 from offices into condominiums and hotel rooms. In his May 2004 plan, Smith decided to top the building with an ornamental spire instead of communications dishes. These dishes, according to the Council on Tall Buildings and Urban Habitat, would not have counted toward the building's height. The spire, however, will count, raising the tower's height to 1,300 feet (396.2 m). At one point in 2005, Trump aspired to build a slightly taller building that would surpass the Sears Tower as the nation's tallest building, but Chicago Mayor Richard M. Daley was against the plan. Eventually, Smith settled on a design with a height of 1,362 feet (415.1 m), which was the height of 2 World Trade Center, the shorter of the former twin World Trade Center towers. This height makes the Tower the seventh tallest in the United States.

=== Initial phases ===
On October 16, 2004, Donald Trump and Hollinger International, the parent company of the Chicago Sun-Times, completed the $73 million sale of the former home of the newspaper a week after it relocated. On October 28, 2004, Trump held a ceremony to begin the demolition of the former Sun-Times Building. The demolition and construction were financed by a $650 million loan from Deutsche Bank and a trio of hedge funds, one of which George Soros backed.

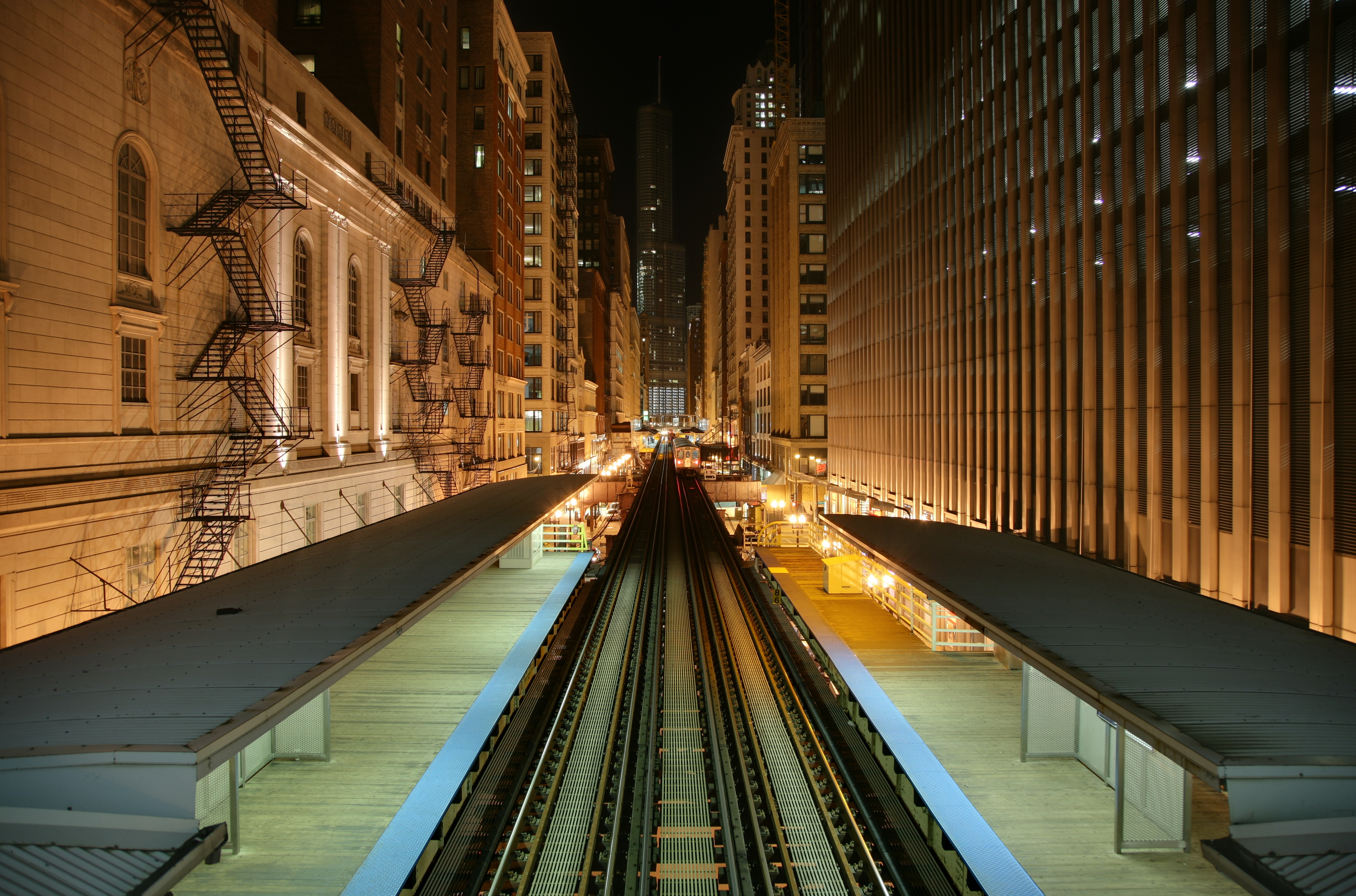
View from the Chicago Transit Authority Chicago 'L' in the Loop at night

In March 2005, the construction process began with the sinking of the first caisson for the tower into the bedrock. In April, construction began on the foundation below the Chicago River. In July 2005, water from the river began seeping into the building site, through crevices in a corner where the foundation wall meets the Wabash Avenue Bridge. Divers discovered that the leak could not be sealed from the water side. After several other failed attempts to correct the problem, a steel plate was driven into the earth next to the gap and the area between the two was excavated; the resulting space was then filled with concrete.

Within a single 24-hour period in October 2005, a fleet of 30 concrete trucks made 600 trips to pour 5,000 cubic yards (3,800 m^{3}) of concrete, and thus create a 200-by-66-by-10-foot (61.0 by 20.1 by 3.0 m) concrete "mat". The mat serves as the base of the building, from which its spine rises. Those involved with the construction referred to the day as the "Big Pour". James McHugh Construction Co. was contracted for the concrete work on this job. They obtained the concrete from the Chicago Avenue and Halsted Street distribution site of Prairie Material Sales Inc of Bridgeview, Illinois, the former largest privately owned ready-mix concrete company in the United States. Prairie used a formula of concrete that had never been used in the construction business to meet a 10,000 psi (69 MPa) specification, which exceeded the standard 7,000 psi (48 MPa) for conventional concrete.

=== Legal issues ===
In October 2006, controversy erupted over a 10-by-4.5-foot (3.0 by 1.4 m) street kiosk at the foot of the Magnificent Mile in front of the Wrigley Building at 410 North Michigan Avenue that advertised Trump Tower a full block away. Extensive debate and publicity occurred on the issue of whether such advertising should have been allowed. Two distinct pieces of legislation in 2002 and 2003 by the Chicago City Council had authorized the kiosk, but sidewalk billboards were not common in Chicago at the time, and their desirability was questioned. Although there were demands from citizens' organizations and the local Alderman Burton Natarus (who had voted in favor of the legislation) to remove the kiosk, Trump agreed only to remove pricing information from the signage, after a request to remove all advertising from it. Originally, one side displayed the geographical information and the other side functioned as a billboard.

In a separate legal development, Donald Trump was sued by former Chicago Sun-Times publisher F. David Radler and his daughters in February 2008 for rescinding all "friends and family" condominium purchases, including Radler's. As president of the Sun-Times' holding company, Radler had negotiated the sale of the paper's headquarters building to Trump's consortium. The price of Radler's condo had been discounted by 10%, and only a 5% deposit was required instead of the standard 15%. Radler and family were part of a group of 40 insiders who were able to purchase property at about $500 per square foot ($5,400/m^{2}). When the market value of the property eventually rose to over $1,300 per square foot ($14,000/m^{2}), Trump nullified the "friends and family" sales. The insiders were involved in the planning and designing of the building. In January 2007, Trump cited both a clause about "matters beyond [the] seller's reasonable control" and the desire to "have more income to handle potentially higher construction costs". Despite Trump's concerns about higher construction costs, earlier in the same month, Ivanka Trump, his daughter, an executive of the company, had stated that the construction was $50 million under budget. In addition to the Radler suit over the validity of the "friends and family" discount contracts, a group of four owners sued over revisions to the closing terms, which placed limits on the owner occupancy of condo hotel units and excluded the meeting rooms and ballrooms from the common elements of which the owners have an interest.

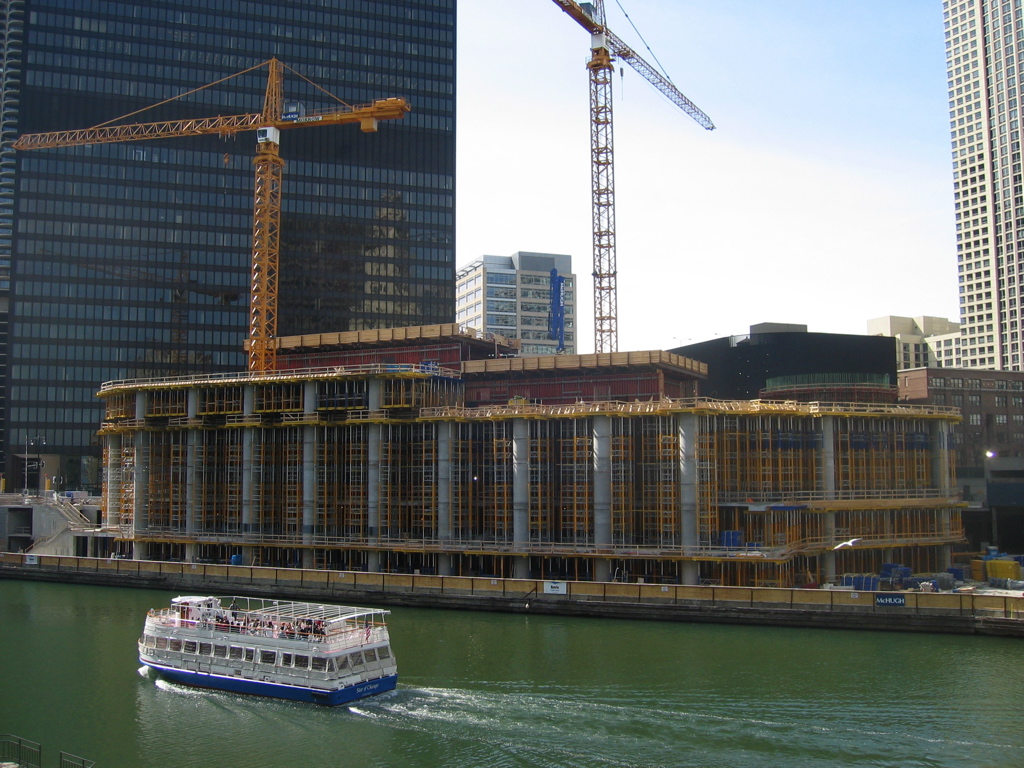
April 2006 view from Michigan Ave. Bridge with visible rebar

In an additional legal issue, on February 8, 2005, Trump had closed on a construction loan of $640 million from Deutsche Bank for the project. He also obtained a $130–135 million junior mezzanine loan from another syndicate headed by Fortress Investment Group. As part of these contracts, Trump had included a $40 million personal guarantee. The contracts also mandated partial repayments for each closed unit sale, and minimum sale prices. In September 2008, due to slow unit sales, Trump sought to extend both loans until mid-2009 because he felt that it was necessary in the business environment and expected from the outset of the contract. On November 10, Deutsche Bank demanded the outstanding loan payment and the $40 million guarantee. Trump filed suit later that month against Deutsche Bank in New York State Supreme Court in an effort to excuse a repayment of more than $330 million that had been due November 7, and to extend the construction loan for an unspecified period of time because of extenuating circumstances during the 2008 financial crisis. Trump cited a "force majeure" clause that allowed the borrower to delay completion of the project under a catch-all section covering "any other event or circumstance not within the reasonable control of the borrower". Trump not only sought an extension, but sought damages of $3 billion from the bank for its use of predatory lending practices to undermine the project and damage his reputation, which he claimed "is associated worldwide with on-time, under-budget, first-class construction projects and first-class luxury hotel operations." At the end of November, Deutsche Bank countersued Trump to force him to uphold his personal payment guarantee from February 2005, after he failed to repay the amount due November 7—a date that already had been extended. The suits did not interfere with Trump's ability to continue drawing on the credit line provided by Deutsche Bank, because without the project's continued financing, Deutsche Bank may have had to assume the role of developer. In March 2009, both parties agreed to suspend litigation and resolve the disagreement amicably in an effort to help the project to succeed. In September 2010, an amended loan agreement stopped the litigation and extended the term on an approximately $600 million construction loan for five years.

=== Construction ===
Bill Rancic, The Apprentice's season-one winner in 2004, was originally hired to manage the project for a $250,000 salary. Rancic's title was President of the Trump International Hotel and Tower, but the title was somewhat misleading, because he was in fact learning on the job as an "Apprentice." Rancic's contract was renewed after his first year, but in September 2005, it appeared that his employment with Trump would finish at the end of his second year in April 2006. During 2005, Donald Trump Jr., who had been involved in the building since its earliest stages in 1999, was overseeing the construction with weekly visits, while Rancic worked on sales and marketing. In December 2005, Rancic made it clear that he wanted to continue working for Trump, and in April 2006, his contract was renewed for a third year. In that year Donald Trump's children began to assume prominent public roles as in the Trump Organization; by January 2007, all three adult Trump children (Ivanka Trump, Donald Trump Jr., and Eric Trump) were executives in the acquisitions and development division of the organization. By the time the Chicago Trump Tower's hotel opened in the building in January 2008, Donald Trump and his three adult children were in the spotlight, overseeing the construction.

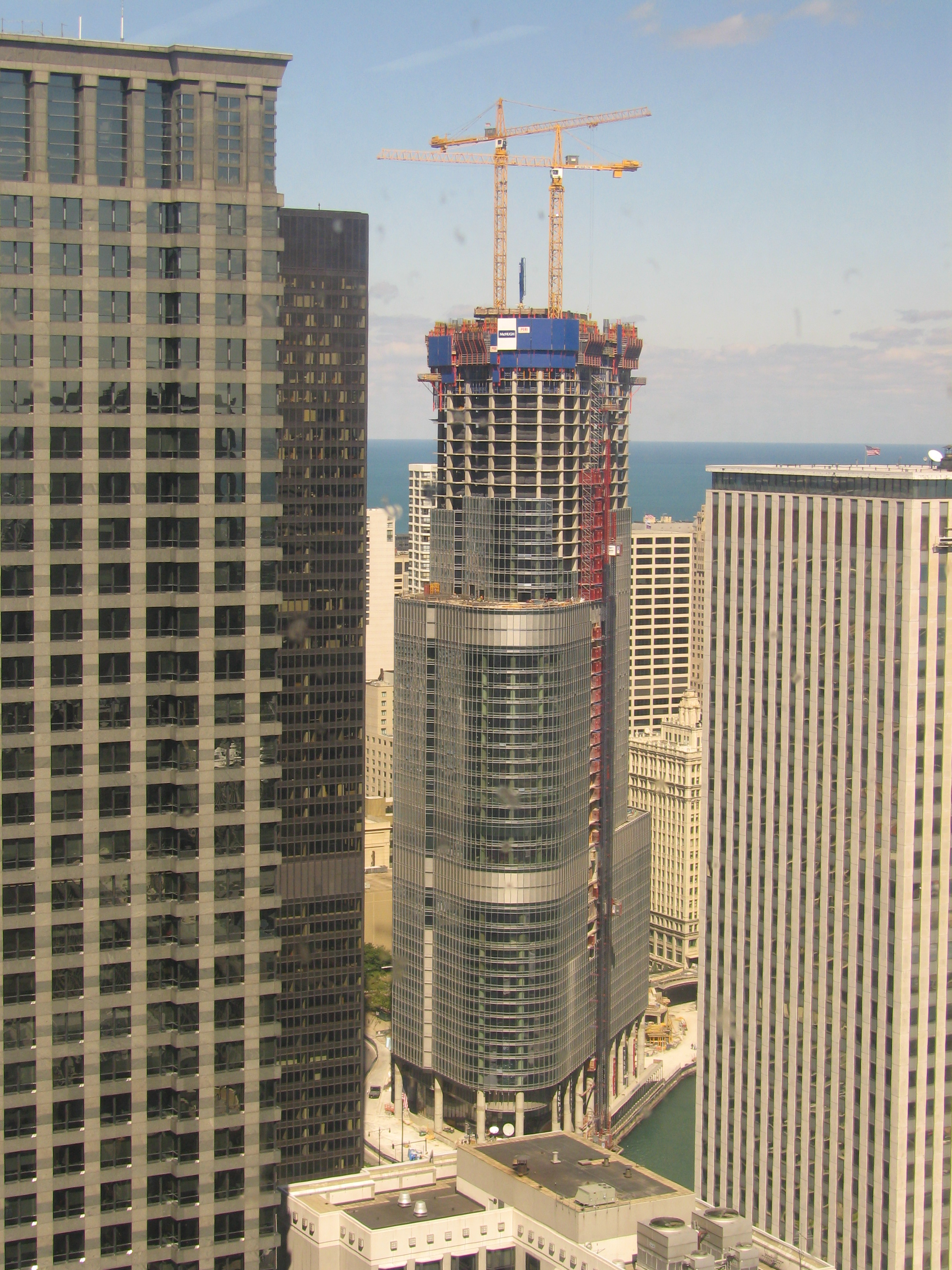
View from Richard J. Daley Center three months before the hotel opened amid construction (September 14, 2007)

Bovis Lend Lease, noted for work on Disneyland Paris, the Petronas Towers, and the Deutsche Bank Center, was the construction company. James McHugh Construction Co, the concrete subcontractor, implemented a comprehensive formwork for the construction of the building. At the completion of construction the building was the tallest formwork structure in the world, and follows in the footsteps of its neighbor, Marina City, as well as Chicago's Two Prudential Plaza, as past recordholders. Concrete moulding was used, because using a traditional ironwork structure would have required a building footprint that would have been too big for the property size, proportional to the height of the designed building. A steel frame would have had to be 25 feet (7.6 m) wider to have supported a building of this proportion. Concrete will counteract the force of wind with the force of gravity of the 360,000-short-ton (330,000 t) building. A new chemical process that leveraged more fluid liquid concrete facilitated pumping concrete up several hundred feet to the elevating construction site. Although previous technology limited formwork to 700 feet (213.4 m), this technology permitted the pumping of concrete 1,700 feet (518.2 m) high.

The building is cantilevered into a section of 420 million-year-old limestone bedrock 110 feet (33.5 m) underground. It uses 4-foot-wide (1.2 m) stilt-like pillars that were drilled beneath the building. Every 30 feet (9.1 m) around its perimeter, steel-reinforced concrete was poured into these holes to form the structural support. On top of these caisson shafts and pillars, an 8,400-short-ton (7,600 t) concrete pad foundation was built to support the building's spine. The building has 241 caissons, and the majority of the caissons only descend 75 feet (22.9 m) into hard clay. However, 57 of them go an additional 35 feet (10.7 m) into the ground, including 6 feet (1.8 m) of bedrock. The concrete spine uses five I-beam-shaped walls and exterior columns, narrowing to two as the building rises. Each floor is separated by a concrete slab, and stainless steel, glass, and aluminum panels are attached to each floor. 50,000 short tons (45,000 t) of reinforcing steel bars, called rebar, support the hotel. The extensive use of concrete makes the building more fireproof. Of the $600 million construction budget, $130 million was earmarked for the James McHugh Construction Co, who handled the 180,000-cubic-yard (140,000 m^{3}) concrete-only portion of the job.

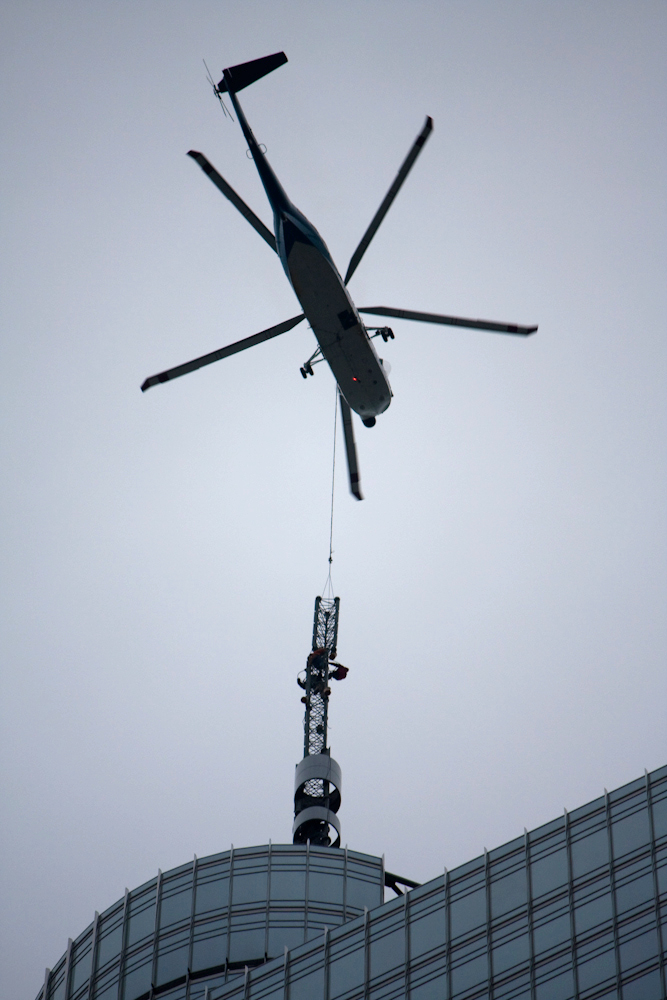
The component sections of the spire were delivered by helicopter.

Two earlier business decisions by the Chicago Sun-Times led to substantial savings of time and money during the Trump Tower's construction. The original 1950s sea wall was built by the newspaper company to bomb-shelter thickness, to withstand a Cold War attack, and thus did not have to be broken down and rebuilt. Furthermore, the company decided in the 1970s to switch from petroleum-based to soy-based ink, which reduced ground pollution from the printing plant. This considerably reduced the costs and time for cleaning up the site prior to building anew.

On August 16, 2008, construction crews made the last major concrete pour to top off the Trump tower's concrete core, which was commemorated with an unofficial ceremony. To celebrate the milestone, a yellow tower crane raised a bucket full of concrete and an American flag to the rooftop of the skyscraper. Another ceremony occurred on August 19, when construction supervisors, structural engineers and company representatives from McHugh Construction made a minor concrete pour at the top of the Trump tower. Although Donald Trump was absent from both of these ceremonies, he, Donald Jr., Ivanka and Eric Trump attended the topping off party on September 24, 2008. Original plans called for the windows to be completed and the spire erected in October 2008. However, the spire installation was delayed through high winds in December 2008, and was finally completed on January 3, 2009. Kamin's critical opinion is that the spire is not aesthetically complementary.

At the September 2008 topping off ceremony, Donald Trump marketed his hotel by expressing doubts about the Chicago Spire ever being completed due to the Great Recession. However, Donald Trump Jr. said that they were fortunate to complete the project, while the Spire and Waterview Tower were among developments affected by the Great Recession. Occupancy had begun on lower-floor condominiums at the time of the ceremony.

Residents of the Trump building are zoned to Chicago Public Schools, more specifically to Ogden School and Wells Community Academy High School.

== After opening ==
=== Retail space ===
Trump owns 70,000 square feet of retail space below street level that had not found renters in any of the years since the building opened in 2009. Retail brokers said the space had a flawed design with "cavernous, irregular, low-ceiling retail spaces" that lacked street frontage and accessibility.

=== Residential unit sales ===
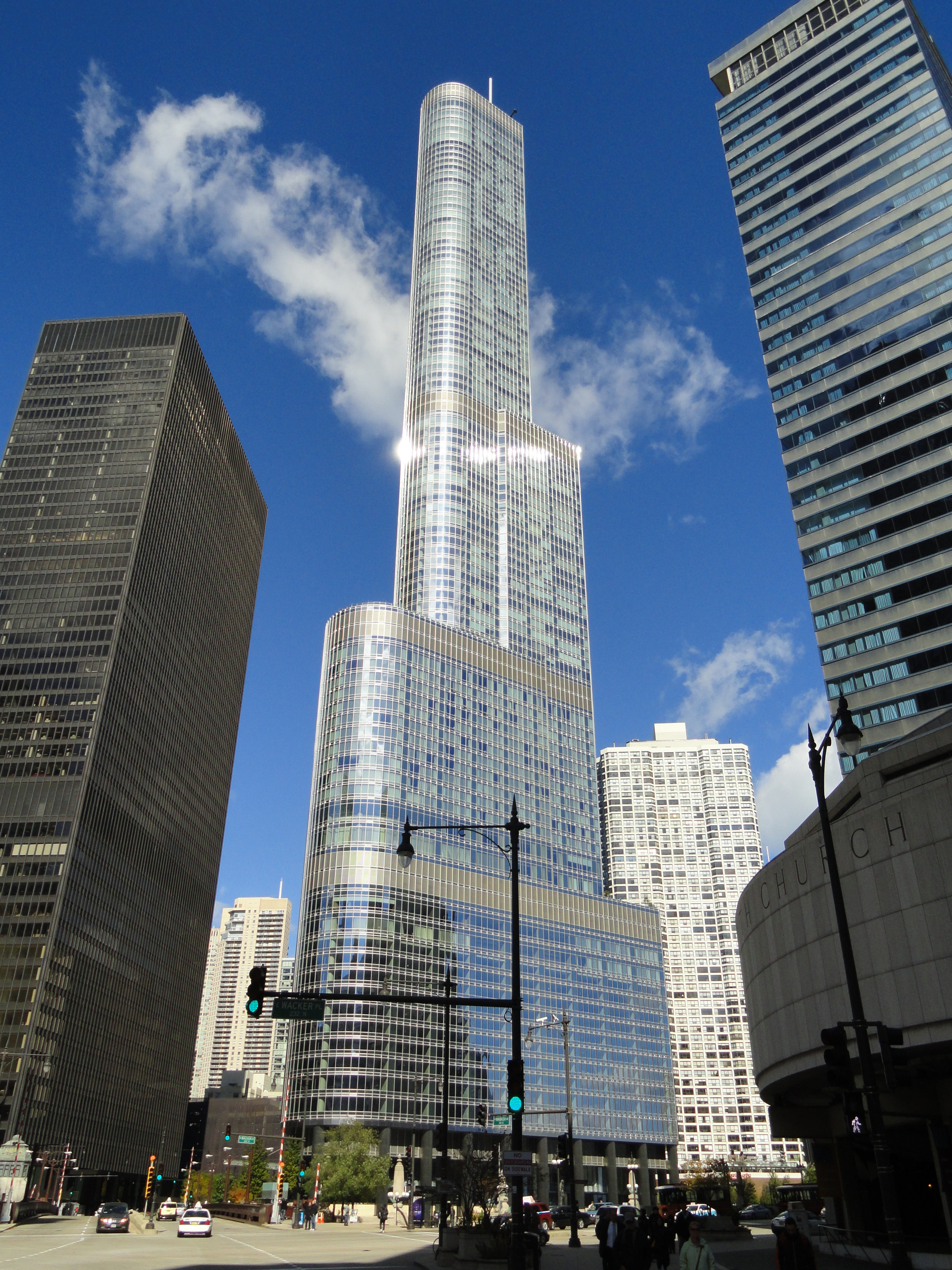
The Tower in 2012

Trump's hotel was 25% unsold at the time of the 2008 topping off ceremony, and was expected to need the mid-2009 construction loan extension that has caused legal complications. This was partially due to the subprime mortgage crisis, which disrupted condominium sales. Trump had sold all but 36 of the building's 486 residential condos at the end of 2012, and 15 remained unsold at the end of 2013. By May 15, 2014, only six units remained for sale including three that were used as the sales center and sales models.

=== Notable residents ===
Several local celebrities purchased units in the building, including numerous professional athletes and artists. Juwan Howard, Rex Grossman, Patrick Kane and R. Kelly were among the purchasers of Trump properties. Derrick Rose purchased a $2.8 million 3,102-square-foot (288.2 m^{2}) condo in spring 2012. Other prominent purchasers of units included McDonald's Chief Executive and President Don Thompson and WMAQ-TV (NBC 5 Chicago) president and general manager David Doebler. United Airlines CEO Jeff Smisek and Huron Consulting Group CEO James Roth also purchased properties in the building.

Two units on the 87th and 88th floors sold for prices in excess of $5 million in 2009 directly from the developer. After a few soft years in the real estate market, it took until August 2014, for units to sell for prices in excess of $1000 per square foot. Two units sold for over $3 million that month including a $3.99 million sale, which was the highest sale price in the building since 2009. The penthouse sold for $17 million in late 2014 to Sanjay Shah, founder and CEO of Vistex.

In May 2016, a one-bedroom unit with a parking space became the first listed Chicago one-bedroom unit to fetch over $1,100-a-square-foot when Mark and Deborah Hellman moved their interests from a one-bedroom to a two-bedroom unit in the building. Overall, however, real estate observers noticed a slowdown in Trump Tower sales due to the controversial nature of the Donald Trump 2016 presidential campaign: prospective buyers who were happy with the actual tower residences were unsure they wanted to be associated with the Trump name.

=== Floods in 2014 ===
In February, after one round of drink service, three men were denied further service at Sixteen due to their apparent intoxication; as a payback, the three pulled what was intended to be a prank. They set off fire alarms and opened a fifth-floor stairwell Chicago Fire Department standpipe valve and flooded elevator shafts with thousands of gallons of water, damaging woodwork, electrical circuitry and marble. The resulting damage was estimated at $700,000 and the three faced felony criminal damage to property charges.

On June 26, a pipe burst near the west public parking entrance, causing the first floor of the tower to flood.

=== Environmental lawsuit ===
In June 2018, through the Abrams Environmental Law Clinic at the University of Chicago, the Illinois Chapter of the Sierra Club and Friends of the Chicago River provided notice of their intent to sue the Chicago Trump International Hotel and Tower over violations of the Clean Water Act, alleging an illegal operation of a cooling water intake structure that siphons water from the Chicago River and likely traps and kills fish and other wildlife. In August 2018, Illinois Attorney General Lisa Madigan filed suit in the Circuit Court of Cook County alleging that though Trump Tower's National Pollutant Discharge Elimination System permit expired on August 31, 2017, it continued to release almost 20 million US gallons (76,000 cubic metres) of water it uses for cooling into the river each day. In February 2021, a judge ruled that the building's management had violated state environmental laws by operating the water intake without a permit and without filing plans detailing how they would minimize the environmental impact.

Madigan's successor Kwame Raoul sued the Trump Organization again in September 2023, alleging the tower continued to take in river water without a valid permit. The Sierra Club and Friends of the Chicago River also filed a renewed complaint that claimed the tower's river intake had been underestimated by 44% in official filings.

On September 9, 2024, Cook County Circuit Court Judge Thaddeus L. Wilson ruled that the Trump Tower's intake system violates state environmental laws that protect the Chicago River, by creating and operating "a public nuisance in violation of Illinois law".

=== Incidents ===
On Sunday, October 18, 2020, at around 5:30 PM (CDT), an unidentified man in his 20s suspended himself from a landing located on the 16th floor and hung down the side of the skyscraper facing the Chicago River for more than thirteen hours. While hanging from the side of the skyscraper, the man filmed a video that was live-streamed on to social media. In the video he was shown hanging from an orange rope, holding a knife in his left hand; he said that if anyone attempted to pull him up using the rope, he would cut it and fall to his death. He then demanded to speak to U.S. President Donald Trump and acknowledged the hard work of the Mayor Lori Lightfoot and Chicago emergency services during the COVID-19 pandemic. He continued by saying that he wanted to speak to the media and he goes on to say that he is not a crazy person. He ends the video by again saying that he wants to speak to the media. Chicago police peacefully resolved the situation with no injuries on Monday, October 19, 2020, at around 6:30 AM (CDT) by negotiating with the suspect. The man was pulled up by several police officers and was taken into custody.

=== Tax deductions ===
In 2024, The New York Times and ProPublica reported that the Internal Revenue Service investigated whether Trump had twice written off losses through construction cost overruns, lagging sales, and selling residential units below value. In his 2008 tax return, he declared the property to be worthless. The two publications calculated that — of the total deduction of $697 million Trump claimed that year — up to $651 million were based on the property's worthlessness. In 2010, he passed ownership of the property from one of his business entities to another one and claimed another $168 million for the next 10 years. The publications, "in consultation with tax experts, calculated that the revision sought by the IRS would create a new tax bill of more than $100 million, plus interest and potential penalties".

== In popular culture ==
In 2004, a top job at the tower, under the tutelage of Trump, was the prize for the winner of the first season of Trump's reality-TV show The Apprentice.

The final confrontation between Batman and the Joker in the film The Dark Knight was shot in the Summer of 2007 at the very top of the construction site of the then partially completed tower.

The building's planning and redesign led to publicity in local and national media both before and during its construction. For example, on September 19, 2007, the Trump International Hotel and Tower was featured on an episode of the Discovery Channel series Build It Bigger titled "High Risk Tower".

When Fox News Channel embarked on its month-long six-city tour to celebrate its 15th anniversary, Neil Cavuto broadcast the network's one-hour Your World with Neil Cavuto show from the riverwalk at the Trump International Hotel & Tower on October 3, 2011.

The tower was also one of the key locations filmed in Chicago for the 2011 film Transformers: Dark of the Moon.

The building, as well as its address "N Michigan Av / E Wacker Dr", feature prominently in the opening of the TV series The Crazy Ones, created by David E. Kelley and aired by CBS during the 2013–2014 season. It is implied that the offices of the fictional advertising firm that is the topic of the series, Lewis, Roberts & Roberts, is inside the building.

== See also ==
- List of buildings and structures
- List of tallest buildings in Chicago
- List of things named after Donald Trump

== Bibliography ==
- Beaver, Robyn, ed. (2007). The Architecture of Adrian Smith, SOM: Toward a Sustainable Future. Images Publishing Group Pty. Ltd. ISBN 978-1-86470-169-2.
- Gil, Fernando Cwilich, ed. (2008). BlackBook: Guide To Chicago 2009 Restaurants, Bars, Clubs, Hotels. Blackbook Media Corp. ISBN 978-1-932942-43-9.
- Fodor's (November 2009). Fodor's Chicago 2010. Fodor's. p. 217. ISBN 978-1-4000-0860-5. "Trump Tower Chicago."
- Forbes Travel Guide: 2010 City Guide: Chicago. The Five Star Corporation. 2010. ISBN 978-1-936010-05-9.
- Time Out: Chicago. Time Out Guides Ltd. 2009. ISBN 978-1-84670-138-2.
- Gattuso, John, ed. (2008). Insight Guides: Chicago. Apa Publications Gmbh & Co. Verlag KG. ISBN 978-981-258-612-4.

Records
Preceded by John Hancock Center	Building with the highest residence above ground-level 2009–2010	Succeeded by Burj Khalifa
