= Les Nomades =

French restaurant in Chicago, Illinois, US

Les Nomades was a French restaurant in the Streeterville neighborhood of Chicago. It closed in October 2025 after 32 years of service.

In its critique, the Michelin Guide noted the restaurant's "particularly interesting wine list." The owner was Mary Beth Liccioni, and Roland Liccioni was the chef de cuisine. Zagat rated the food 4.9 out of 5.

== Cuisine ==
The Michelin Guide described it as "classical French cuisine", adding "Come dinnertime, diners look forward to a prix-fixe menu that allows them to choose between various courses, including an ahi tart, warming mushroom soup and sweet Grand Marnier soufflé."

== Dress code ==
Les Nomades required men to wear a suit or sport coat in the restaurant.

== Influence ==
Classically trained chef Chris Nugent had a seven-year tenure at Les Nomades prior to opening prix fixe restaurant Goosefoot in Lincoln Square, Chicago.

== See also ==
- Alinea
- Spiaggia
- Oriole
- List of Michelin-starred restaurants in Chicago
