= Iliana Regan =

American chef (born 1979)

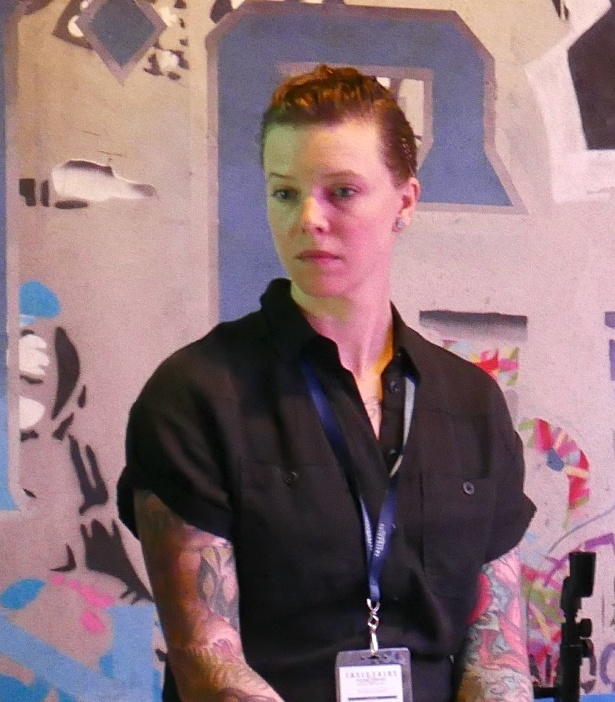
- Born: 1979 (age 46–47); Merrillville, Indiana
- Education: Indiana University Bloomington; Columbia College Chicago
- Culinary career
- Current restaurant(s): Elizabeth, The Milkweed Inn
- Previous restaurant(s): Trio, Schwa, Alinea
- Award(s) won: 2014 Michelin Star, Elizabeth 2016 Food & Wine Best New Chef

Iliana Regan is an American chef and restaurateur. She ran the restaurant Elizabeth in Chicago from 2012 to 2020, receiving Michelin stars in each year. Since 2019, she has been the owner of The Milkweed Inn in Wetmore, Michigan.

== Early life and education ==
Regan was born (1979) in Merrillville, Indiana. Her mother was a scratch cook and her steelworker father was a gardener. She and her three older sisters grew up on a 10-acre farm. She studied chemistry at Indiana University before earning a degree in creative writing at Columbia College Chicago. In the spring of 2022 she earned an MFAW from the School of the Art Institute of Chicago.

== Career ==
Regan worked as a waitress and as a cook in several fine-dining restaurants in Chicago, including Trio, Schwa, and Alinea under Grant Achatz and Michael Carlson.

In 2008, she began selling microgreens and vegetables at farmer's markets, soon expanding her offerings to include pierogi. In 2010, she started a weekly supper club hosting 10 to 12 diners in her apartment. Through the supper club, Regan met several investors interested in supporting her opening her own restaurant.

Regan named her restaurant Elizabeth for her deceased sister, opening in Chicago's Lincoln Square in 2012. Elizabeth features home-grown and foraged ingredients, originally served multi-course prix fixe menus at three 8-seat communal tables in the style of Regan's supper club. She later condensed the menu and removed the communal tables. The restaurant was immediately well-received, earning a Michelin star in its second year.

Regan opened a second restaurant in 2017, Kitsune, with Japanese influences. It closed in 2019. In July 2020 she passed ownership of Elizabeth to her employees.

In 2019, Regan and her wife Anna opened The Milkweed Inn, in Nahma Township in Michigan's Upper Peninsula. The Milkweed Inn hosts 10 guests each weekend April through October at $750 to $1750 per person for a "new gatherer" culinary experience. Accommodations include three rooms inside the inn, a platform tent and a small Airstream trailer. A 2019 weekend "starts with pierogi and smoked lake trout on Friday and peaks on Saturday with a 15-course dinner that might include wild blueberries in juiced wood sorrel, young milkweed pods fried until the insides turn as silky as cheese, and moose tartare."

Regan published a memoir in 2019 titled Burn the Place. The New York Times called it "perhaps the definitive Midwest drunken-lesbian food memoir." In it she describes incidents "before she got sober 10 years ago, ran away from the police in handcuffs, had sex in bar bathrooms and used her car key to administer bumps of cocaine." The New Yorker review cited Burn the Place as more than just a chef memoir, writing "More rightly, it belongs on a shelf with the great memoirs of addiction, of gender ambivalence and queer coming-of-age..."

In January 2023 her second memoir, Fieldwork was published highlighting her years spent foraging and living in the woods.

== Recognition ==
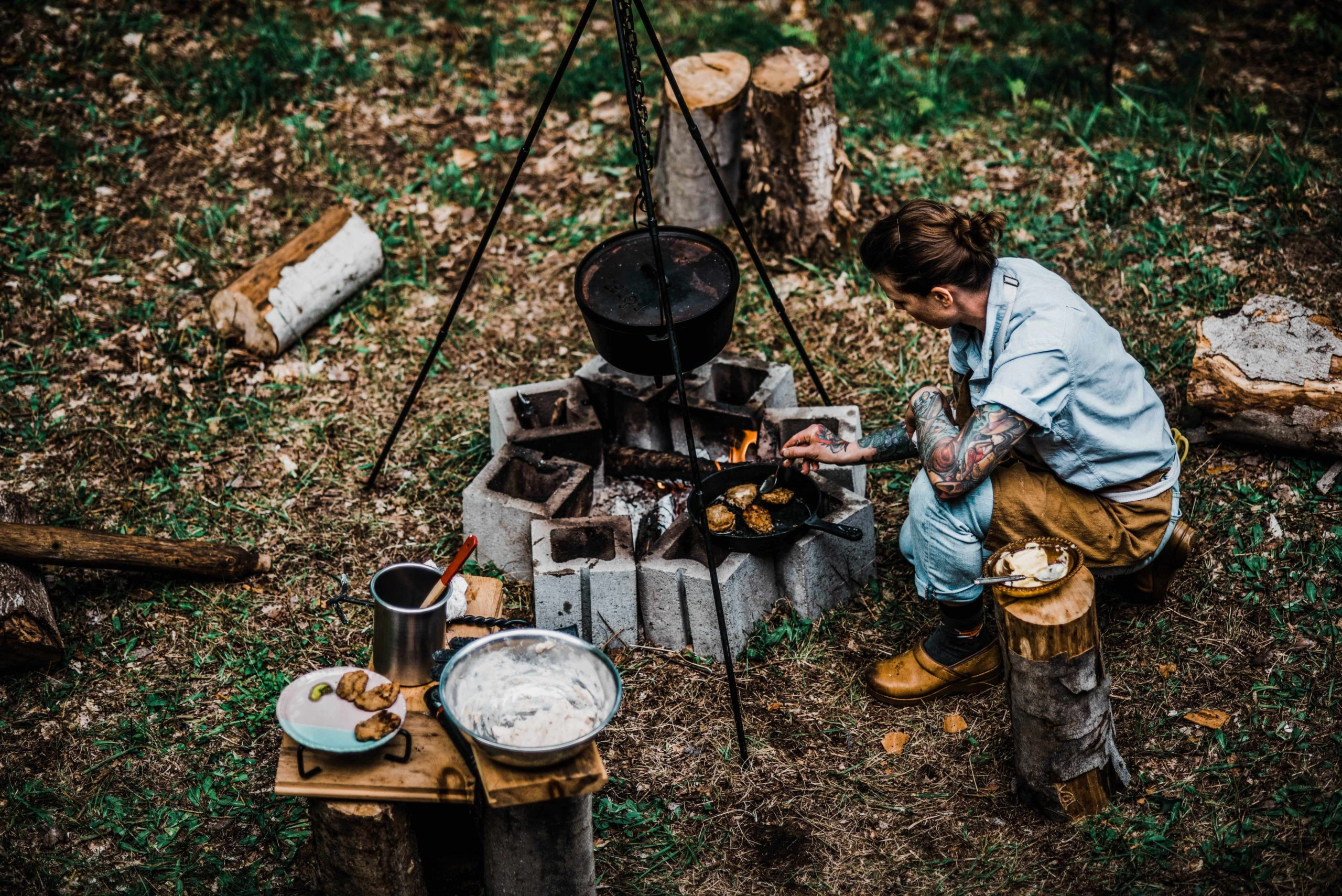

In 2008 Chicago Magazine named Regan's pierogi the best in the city. In 2016, Regan was named one of Food & Wine magazine's best new chefs. She was also named to the Crain's Chicago Business 40 Under 40. David Chang called her one of the best chefs he has ever known.

Regan's book Burn the Place was longlisted for the National Book Award in 2019, the first time in 40 years a book in food had received such recognition since Julia Child in 1979. Smithsonian named Burn the Place to their list of 2019's ten best books about food. Burn the Place won the Midland Author's prize in non-fiction Burn the Place also won the prize in non-fiction from Story Studio Chicago.

== Personal life ==
Regan is married to Anna Hamlin. They met while Hamlin was working with a wine distributor and managing the Elizabeth account. They reside at Milkweed Inn with their four dogs.
