= Made In Cookware =

American cookware manufacturer

- Company type: Private
- Industry: Consumer Goods
- Founded: 2017
- Founder: Jake Kalick; Chip Malt
- Headquarters: Austin, Texas
- Products: Cookware, bakeware, tabletop, knives, accessories
- Website: madeincookware.com

Made In Cookware is a privately owned manufacturer of high-end kitchen supplies based in Austin, Texas. It sells stainless steel sets, nonstick and regular frying pans, stockpots, saucers, woks, knife sets, and other cookware to professional chefs and home cooks through its e-commerce site.

The direct-to-consumer (DTC) brand shares tips and stories, recipe videos, and technical instructions on its website and via social media; the Made In Studio space also hosts functions for Austin nonprofits, as well as industry parties and recipe-testing events.

The company’s products are used in over 2,000 restaurants. The brand is known for its competitive DTC pricing and has been embraced by several well-known chefs, including restaurateur and Top Chef personality Tom Colicchio, who is an investor.

Other investors have included private equity firm KarpReilly, Bonobos founder Brian Spaly, and Alinea restaurant co-owners Grant Achatz and Nick Kokonas.

== History ==
Childhood friends and native Bostonians Johnathan "Jake" Kalick and Bradford "Chip" Malt founded Made In Cookware in 2017, inspired by the direct–to-consumer success of businesses like Warby Parker and mattress retailer Casper. Private equity firm KarpReilly was an original investor.

Kalick’s family has been involved in the kitchen supply business for four generations, dating to 1929, when his grandfather founded Boston's Harbour Food Service Equipment. Malt brought online brand-building expertise, having developed his marketing and analytics skills at Rhone Apparel.

The pair relocated Made In Cookware to Austin the year after its founding, attracted by the city’s food culture and its status as home base to consumer brands such as Yeti and Outdoor Voices. That same year, it announced a partnership with Chef Tom Colicchio.

In 2019, Made In Cookware raised some $5 million in a seed round. Bonobos founder Brian Spaly led the round, which also included Ezra Galston of venture capital firm Starting Line Ventures.

The DTC brand partnered with another world-famous chef in 2021: baker, author, and restaurateur Nancy Silverton. The partnership resulted in a collection of porcelain bakeware, among other items.

Made In Cookware expanded into brick-and-mortar retail for the first time in 2022 with a pop-up store on South Congress in Austin. A second Austin pop-up location followed at The Domain in 2023. Both locations have since closed.

The company launched a Canadian website in 2024, promising two- to five-day shipping across most of the country. It also launched a UK e-commerce site later that year.
