= Dave Beran =

American chef

- Culinary career
- Current restaurant(s): Seline Pasjoli
- Previous restaurant: Dialogue

Dave Beran is an American chef and restaurateur.

== Early life and education ==
Beran was born in Ashland, Wisconsin, and graduated from Lake Forest College in 2003.

== Career ==
Beran was the executive chef at Next, which is co-owned by Grant Achatz and Nick Kokonas. He announced his departure from Next Restaurant on April 14, 2016, citing his desires to start his own restaurant in Los Angeles. He owned and operated two restaurants in the Santa Monica neighborhood of Los Angeles: Dialogue, now permanently closed (one michelin star), and Pasjoli (one michelin star). His newest restaurant, Seline, is a fine dining tasting menu located in Santa Monica.

== Awards ==
Under Dave Beran's oversight, Next received the James Beard award for Best New Restaurant in 2012.

After being nominated three times in the three years prior, for best new chef and for rising star chef, in 2014, Beran won the James Beard Foundation award for Best Chef: Great Lakes. Also in 2014, Beran, along with 10 other chefs from around the country, was included in the Food & Wine class of best new chefs.

Beran returned to the James Beards awards in 2026 and won the award for Best Chef: California in 2026, 12 years after his wine for Best Chef: Great Lakes.

== Restaurants ==
After leaving The Alinea Group in Chicago in 2017, Beran moved to Los Angeles to open his first restaurant, Dialogue. Dialogue held one Michelin star before closing in October 2020. In 2019, he opened Pasjoli in Santa Monica.

His newest restaurant, Seline, earned one Michelin star in June 2026.

== Personal life ==
Beran lives in Los Angeles with his wife, Jamie Schneiter, and two French Bulldogs. Beran is an avid marathon runner and has been known to run the Chicago Marathon and show up to work a full day afterwards.
