= Lazy Bear =

Restaurant in San Francisco, California, U.S.

Coordinates: 37°45′37.4″N 122°25′11″W

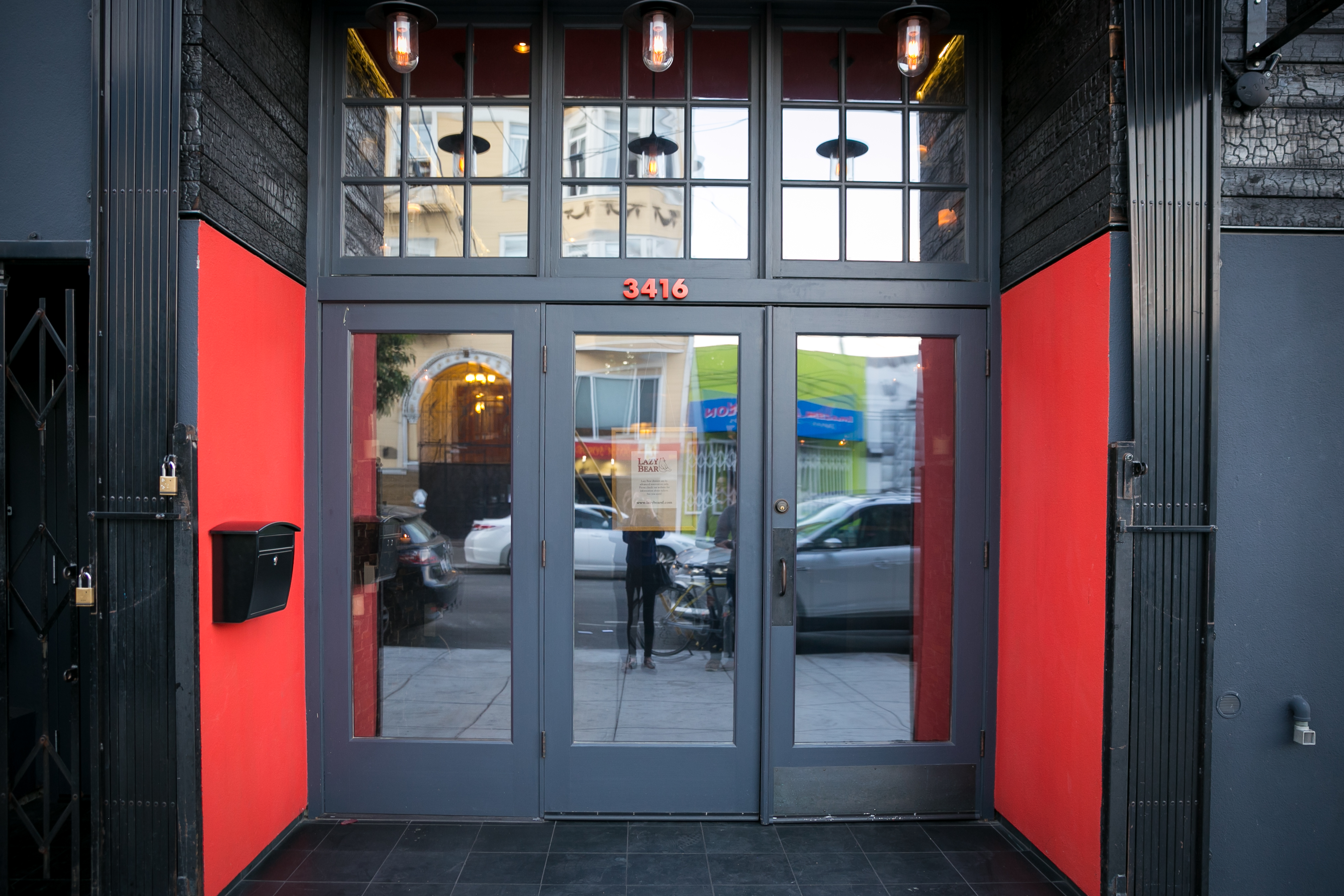
- Restaurant entrance
- Interactive map of Lazy Bear

Restaurant information
- Established: September 25, 2014
- Owner: David Barzelay
- Manager: Colleen Booth (managing partner)
- Chef: David Barzelay
- Food type: Modern Californian
- Rating: (Michelin Guide)
- Location: 3416 19th Street, San Francisco, California, 94110, United States
- Website: lazybearsf.com

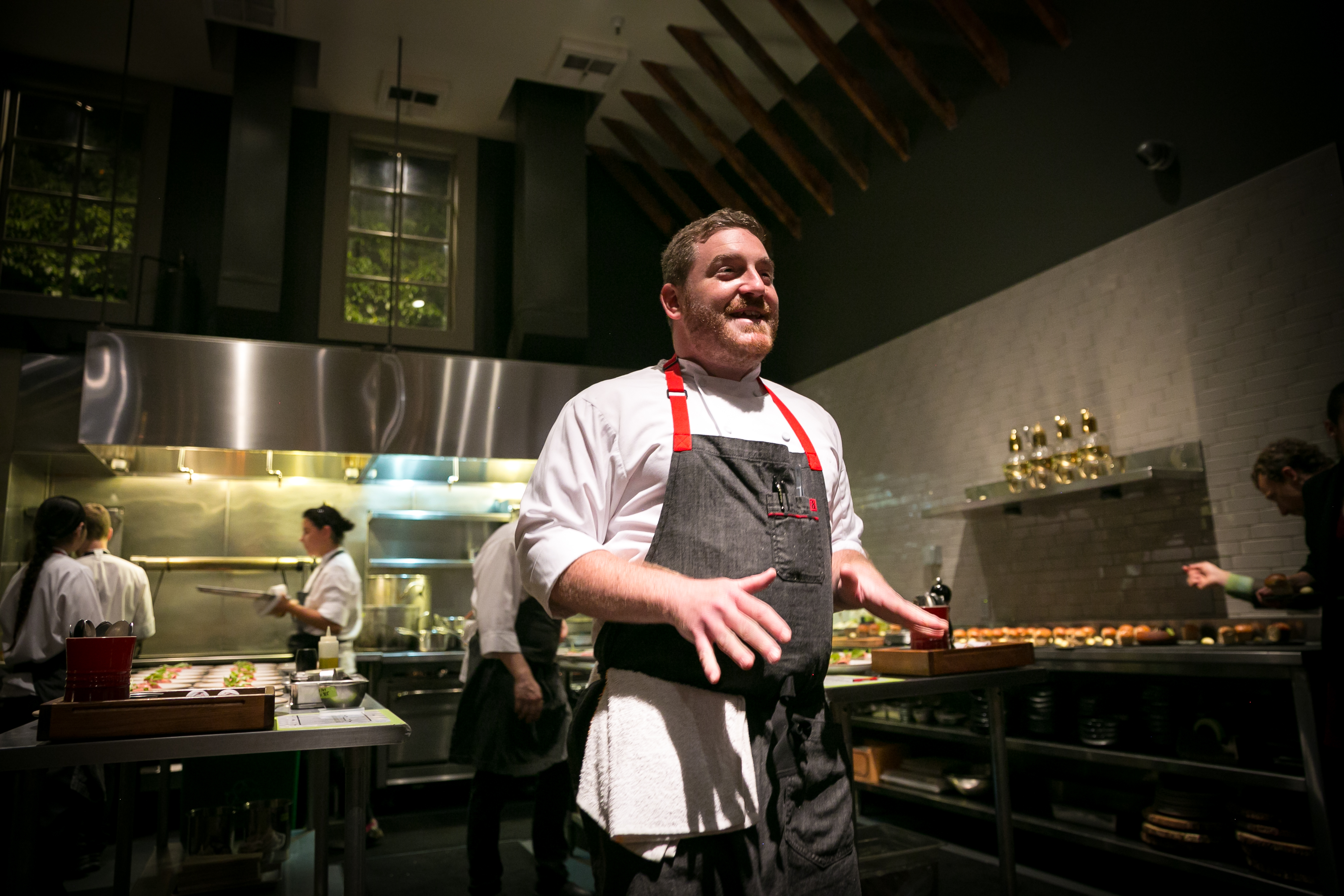
Chef David Barzelay in the open kitchen, 2015

Lazy Bear is a dinner restaurant in the Mission District of San Francisco, California, with two Michelin stars. It is owned by chef David Barzelay and managing partner Colleen Booth. Opened by Barzelay in 2014 as the successor to a series of unlicensed paid dinner parties, until the COVID-19 pandemic it emulated a dinner party, with diners eating communally at two long tables. The cocktail bar True Laurel and the French restaurant JouJou are affiliated with Lazy Bear, and Barzelay has also been a partner in a casual restaurant, The Automat.

== History ==
In spring 2009, lawyer and food blogger David Barzelay's wife organized an auction for a dinner for ten people cooked by him and hosted at their San Francisco apartment. The winning bid of $1,500 led him to explore working professionally as a chef after his job ended in the Great Recession. He staged at two restaurants, and then held his first paying dinner party on September 19, 2009. He named the dinner series or restaurant pop-up Lazy Bear, an anagram of his name that his wife had pointed out. When the dinners had become semi-monthly and caused complaints from neighbors, he rented time at an events space in the Bernal Heights neighborhood, hosting illegal dinners for 240 guests a week. Lazy Bear opened as a restaurant in the Mission District on September 25, 2014, at which time the "underground restaurant" was operating three times a week and was one of San Francisco's highest-rated dining establishments on Yelp. Lazy Bear was named Eater SF's Restaurant of the Year in November 2014, and was a semifinalist for a James Beard Foundation Award for Best New Restaurant and one of 50 nominees for Bon Appétit's 2015 list of the ten best new restaurants in America. It was awarded a Michelin star in 2015 and a second star in 2016. Barzelay was named one of Food & Wine magazine's Best New Chefs in April 2016.

Barzelay was inspired by the Chicago restaurant Alinea and others that offered fine dining in a relatively casual ambience. Diners buy tickets on Tock rather than making reservations; the pop-up restaurant used a lottery system devised by Barzelay, and for the brick and mortar restaurant Barzelay licensed Alinea's ticketing system. Each course was presented by the chefs, and instead of a menu diners receive a personal copy of a "field guide" decorated with line art and with space for making notes. One of the signature dishes is lamb chops for which Barzelay "drew inspiration from his dad's grilling", and the pop-up was BYOB, with patrons sharing wine with each other. From the start, Lazy Bear has included service charges in its prices, and paid staff unusually well with benefits. In January 2015, Barzelay introduced demand-based prices.

The restaurant's decor was intended to evoke a camp in the Catskills. The vaulted dining room has exposed wood beams and is lined in cedar planking charred using the Japanese shou sugi ban technique, with a white-line drawing of the Yosemite Valley on dark grey canvas hanging on one wall. The restaurant does not use tablecloths, and the two long tables with which it opened were cut from a single elm tree. Food & Wine described it as "a lounge straight out of a Wes Anderson movie set in your weird rich uncle’s Yosemite hunting lodge". The decor also includes allusions to the restaurant's name, such as Smokey Bear signs and imitation animal trophy heads. The mezzanine "Bear's Den" lounge, with à la carte service and used for mingling before and after the meal, had couches draped in camp blankets and was originally decorated with a shelf of knickknacks including a plaster bust of a bear, a lantern, and a small axe, which Barzelay said was inspired by Cracker Barrel.

Until the COVID-19 pandemic, diners ate communally, banquet-style, in two sittings at two long tables without white tablecloths. After serving diners in a parklet while indoor dining was prohibited and offering "Camp Commissary" meals to go, Lazy Bear reopened in 2021 with a more conventional table arrangement with individual bookings and staggered dining times. In July 2024, after a week-long return to the communal dining format, it closed for renovation; when it reopened in October, Barzelay had himself cut the long tables into small tables, and a banquette had been added in the dining room. There are also now tables overlooking the kitchen in the mezzanine. The renovation also added exposed rock in the entryway to evoke the entrance to a bear cave.

Managing partner Colleen Booth told the San Francisco Chronicle in 2026 that Lazy Bear staff create a long chit for each party at the point of reservation, including dietary restrictions and any special reason for the reservation, and ultimately lays a blue or red marker across it as a visual signal of which course is in preparation or has been served to the table.

In March 2020, Barzelay announced that Lazy Bear would be entirely vegan for nine days in April, as a promotion for the nonprofit Zero Foodprint and to draw attention to the restaurant's vegan options. In April 2025, the restaurant introduced a bespoke cannabis strain, Lazy Bear Reserve.

== Reception ==
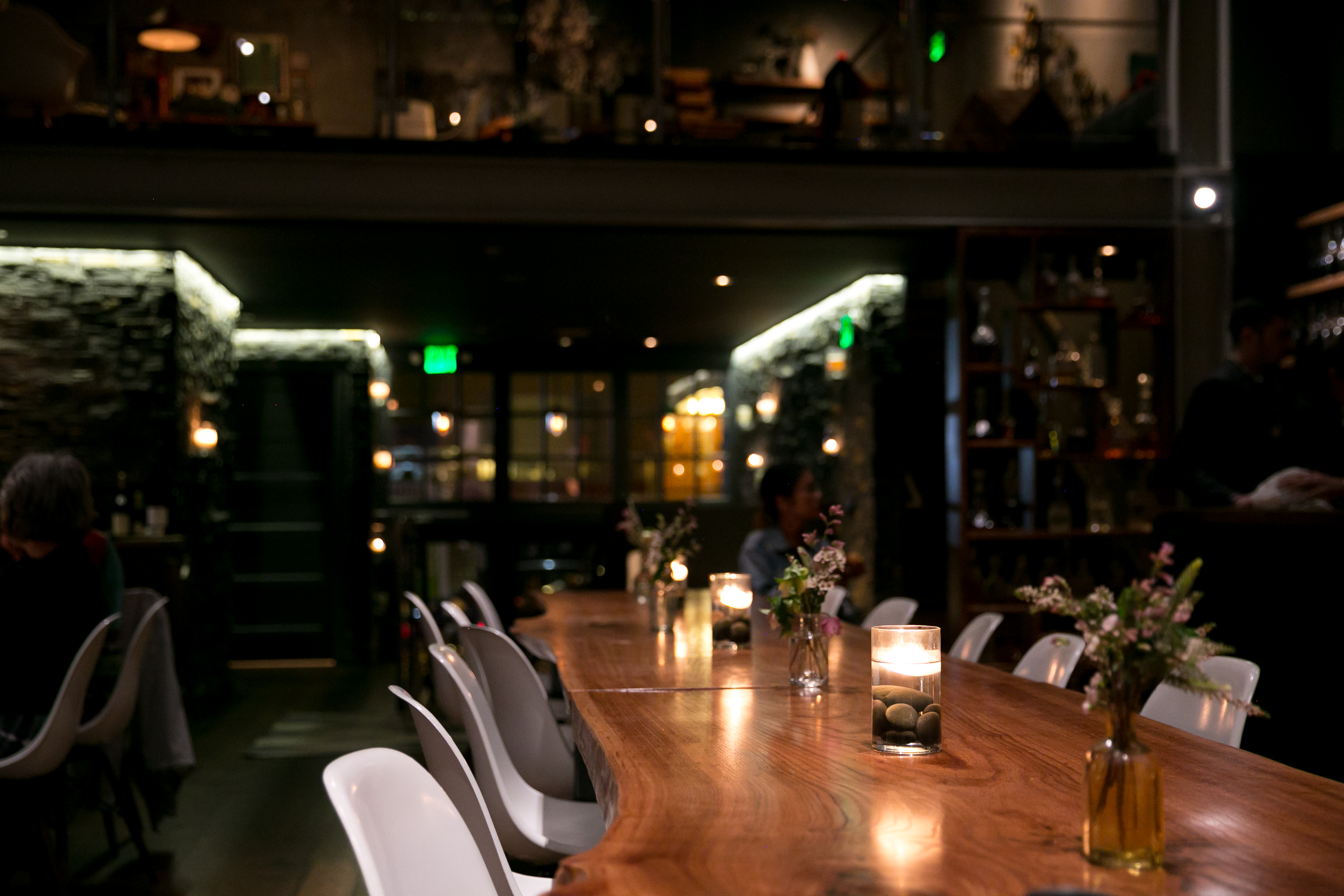
Communal table at Lazy Bear in 2015

The Michelin Guide describes the Modern California cuisine at Lazy Bear as "sweeping [in] creative scope, drawing on both nostalgia and current culinary trends". In 2015, a reviewer for Bon Appétit wrote that the concept "could ring gimmicky—if the decidedly fine-dining food wasn't so spot on", and the San Francisco Chronicle's longtime restaurant critic, Michael Bauer, compared it to Chez Panisse. The restaurant is noted as expensive. One reviewer "would argue there isn't a restaurant in the Bay Area where that money would be better spent when it comes to fine dining", but another wrote that it was "a lot of fun ... [but] not every dish is as memorable as we'd want for a meal so expensive". The restaurant's popularity crashed booking software when tickets were made available for the first two weeks in the brick and mortar restaurant, and in 2017 Lazy Bear was still "booked solid every day"; Barzelay was an early adopter of Pared, software for locating fill-in restaurant staff created by the owner of a Bay Area restaurant chain.

Lazy Bear was in Bauer's 2015 list of the 100 best restaurants in San Francisco, the Chronicle's last pre-pandemic list in 2019, and the list of 88 published in 2020–21, but not in the 2025 list of 100 Bay Area restaurants, which omitted most two-star restaurants in the region. It was number 100 on the 2026 list.

== Associated ventures ==
In December 2017, Lazy Bear opened an associated cocktail bar, True Laurel (originally to have been called Flowershop), run by the restaurant's head bartender, Nicolas Torres, and with food organized by chef de cuisine Geoff Davis. Torres then became a consultant at Lazy Bear. True Laurel has been listed by the San Francisco Chronicle as one of the best cocktail bars in the city, and in 2025 was on the annual list of North America's 50 Best Bars.

Matthew Kirk, sous-chef at Lazy Bear, left in 2016 to open a pop-up restaurant, Automat. He and Barzelay opened it in November 2021 as a brick and mortar casual dining restaurant in the Western Addition. It closed in August 2023.

In January 2025, Barzelay and Booth announced plans to open a French restaurant, JouJou, in the Design District; it opened in March 2026.

== Notable people ==
Chef Joe Sasto formerly served as executive sous chef at Lazy Bear.

Maya Erickson, formerly of EQ, was the pastry chef at Lazy Bear from its opening as a restaurant to mid-2016, and was featured in the San Francisco Chronicle as a culinary rising star.

Jacob Brown, beverage director at Lazy Bear, was a finalist for a James Beard Foundation Award in 2025.

== See also ==
- List of Michelin-starred restaurants in California
