= Michael Carlson (chef) =

Michael Carlson (born June 5, 1974) is a chef and restaurateur from Chicago, Illinois. After dropping out of culinary school, Carlson got his start in the industry working under Paul Bartolotta. From there he studied abroad in Italy under Valentino Marcattilii, and in England under Heston Blumenthal. Carlson says he learned more from American chef Grant Achatz than anyone else.

In late 2005 Carlson opened his first restaurant – Schwa – in Chicago. He and the restaurant have received critical acclaim. Carlson is known for his "unstressed" approach to food, creating simple dishes from unconventional ingredients. Outsiders view Carlson as an inconsiderate recluse, but co-workers describe him as a kind and generous person. Carlson is known for his casual demeanor and conversation. He lives with his girlfriend, Rachel Brown, and his two-year-old daughter, Lily, in Logan Square.

== Background ==
Michael Carlson was born June 5, 1974, in Chicago, Illinois and grew up in the Chicago suburbs of Glen Ellyn and Lombard. The son of a financial planner father, Stan, and dental hygienist mother, Carlson describes his childhood as "normal". His parents divorced and his father served as a colonel in the US army reserves during the Gulf War. As a result, he briefly lived with his older brother during his teens.

Carlson says he is not sure when he first became interested in food, although his mother ascribes his interest to watching Julia Child as a young boy. He does, however, remember his first encounter with gourmet cooking. At age 12, while staying at a fancy hotel in Quebec, he had duck with blueberries at the hotel's restaurant. He got his first professional cooking experience while working a local bar during college.

In 1998, after completing college Carlson enrolled at the Cooking and Hospitality Institute of Chicago (CHIC) and got chef's position at Spiaggia under Paul Bartolotta. He quit CHIC after one semester, due in part to an instructor who began a pasta-making class by demonstrating the proper way to open a box. Bartolotta, however, saw promise in Carlson and arranged for him to study under Valentino Marcattilii at San Domenico in Italy. While in Italy, Carlson staged at more than fifteen different restaurants. Carlson describes the experience as a turning point in his career. "It was the first time I really thought about food," he explains.

Upon returning to the states, Carlson became Grant Achatz's first hire at Trio. Carlson stayed at Trio for about 18 months, before moving to England to train under Heston Blumenthal at The Fat Duck. Carlson later described Achatz as the best chef he ever worked for and said he learned more under Achatz than he did in four years elsewhere. He enjoyed the job at Trio so much that he went in to work on his days off, despite only earning $20,000 a year.

=== Schwa ===
Carlson returned to Chicago and was offered the sous-chef position at Achatz's Alinea that was about to open. He was planning on accepting the position, but before the restaurant opened he bumped into an old friend. As it happened, the friend owned a small restaurant named Lovitt, which he was planning on closing in order to move out of state. Carlson fell in love with the space, and worked at Lovitt for several months before it closed, learning the business end of being a chef. Lovitt closed in the fall of 2005, and Carlson was offered the restaurant's equipment for a bargain price. Financed by his father, Carlson opened Schwa in Lovitt's old location. Schwa quickly gained the attention of both local and national critics. By May 2006, Chicago magazine had made note of Carlson's rapid rise saying "We love his food – and his genuine sense of surprise at Schwa's success." At the end of 2006, Schwa was named one of Citysearch's "Top 10 New Restaurants" of 2006.

Schwa combines "unstressed", upscale food with a "laid-back atmosphere".

=== Anniversary celebration ===
In October 2007, Carlson was invited to host many of the world's top chefs as part of Charlie Trotter's 20th anniversary celebration. At first Carlson declined the offer, but reconsidered saying "how often do you get to cook for those cats?" The event was only eleven days away, and Carlson was ill-equipped to handle the large party of famous chefs. He fired a cook he did not feel was worthy and had to borrow the services of his former, and Grant Achatz's current, sous-chef Nathan Klingbail. He had to buy more plates and went virtually without sleep. "You couldn't imagine the anxiety," Carlson explains.

When the big day arrived, the guest list included more than a dozen world-famous chefs including Ferran Adria, Heston Blumenthal, Thomas Keller, and Pierre Hermé. The evening included an elaborate 14-course, 4-hour meal which Carlson later described "It was as high a pinnacle as you could ever have. It will never get better than that." He stated the event was "the most important night of [his] career", and refused to accept payment for his services.

The guests were delighted with the food. Blumenthal said he "ate everything on [his] plate" and that he loved the passion, while Adria added that the staff was "young and brilliant". Herme said he "enjoyed all the different flavors and textures," while Trotter himself described Carlson as brilliant. Mike Sheerin summed it up: "It was really an amazing dinner."

Despite its success, the service was a severe strain on Carlson. He called his father after everyone left and said "I don't know if I have anything else in me now. The next morning he closed Schwa, leaving behind a stocked refrigerator and full reservation book. Carlson went on a drinking and drug binge and disappeared completely for public life for four months. At the age of 33, his career was assumed to be over.

=== Comeback ===
After a three-month break, Carlson returned to cooking. reopening Schwa in February 2008. Carlson aimed to better work and family balance to avoid burning out again. He hired an additional chef, created a less labor-intensive menu, and turned more of his attention to the dining room. The customers quickly returned, as did the critic's praise, leading one observer to write "Forget Ratatouille. This is an Oscar-worthy redemption story. Are you listening, Hollywood?"

In 2009, Carlson was again asked by Trotter to host an evening of world-famous chefs. This time Trotter insisted on paying and Carlson survived the evening without incident. Carlson continues to work long-hours, sometimes with his family at his side, but says he would not change anything, describing cooking as a "dream job". He has said he has no interest in cashing in on the current celebrity-chef craze, and does not see himself ever leaving Chicago. He was selected to appear on Iron Chef America, but declined to participate.

== Approach to food and critical acclaim ==
The Chicago Sun-Times describes Carlson's cooking style as "New American", but Carlson himself prefers the description "unstressed food". "What's most important is that everyone ... has an incredible time," he says. One of Carlson's favorite cooking techniques is to make ingredients that people normally would not tolerate into something palatable. He is known to combine ingredients in bizarre ways, such as pairing oysters with oatmeal and raisins. Despite these wild dishes, Carlson is perhaps best known for his simplistic, modern interpretations of classic Italian dishes. His quail egg ravioli is considered his signature dish. The one element that ties all Carlson's dishes together is fat. "Fat carries flavor really well," he explains.

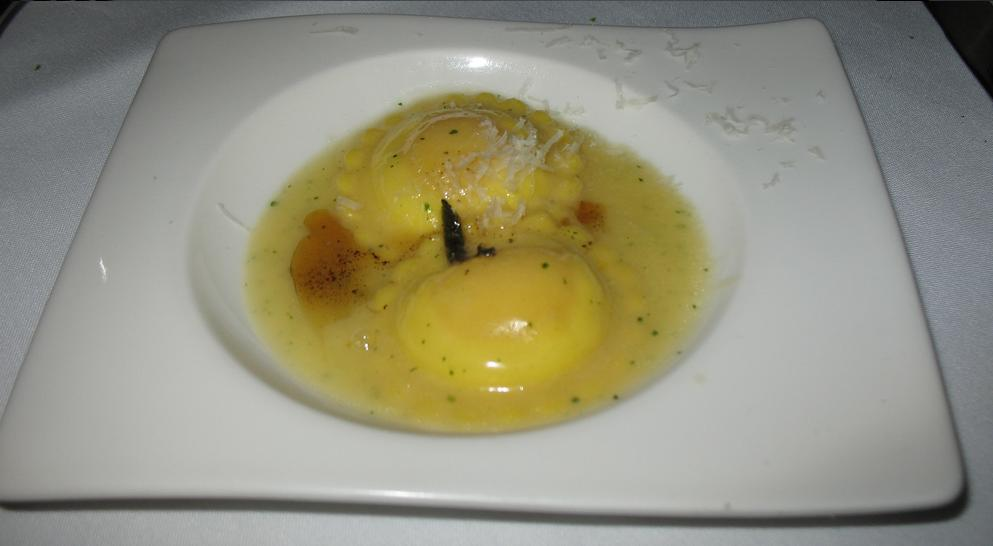
Carlson's most famous dish – Quail Egg Ravioli

Carlson does not serve bread, once stating that he did not believe in it. He likes to combine sophisticated ingredients like brioche and quail eggs with a casual atmosphere. Carlson lists "pork bellies, lardo and large quantities of fat" as his favorite ingredients, and serves purées with most dishes.

Carlson cooking techniques have been described as "avant-garde", "innovative",, and "high-tech chemistry". He sometimes employs the sous-vide method of cooking and is known to use unconventional tools such as emulsifying gels, congealing agents, foams, and liquid nitrogen. Carlson lists Achatz and Blumenthal as his biggest influences, but lists Bertolotta and Marcattilii as also contributing to his Italian-style dishes. He adds that Alinea is his "favorite restaurant for sure".

Carlson does not like standing still professionally. His girlfriend Rachel Brown observes, "He thinks what he did last year isn't good enough for this year." Schwa is infamous for disappearing dishes. "If he's bored with something, no matter how many people love it and demand it, he's done with it," says Brown. On the other hand, Carlson has no interest in transitioning from chef to chef-restaurateur. He has rejected offers of investment and calls to move to a better location with more space. "Nah, I'm happy," with the way things are, he says. Carlson is said to be a perfectionist when it comes to food, and has only missed one night of work in his career at Schwa.

Food critics generally appreciate what Carlson does. Writing for the Chicago Tribune, food critic Phil Vettel describes Carlson as "creative with his ingredients, artistic in his presentations and utterly fearless with flavor pairings." Another critic called him a "culinary maverick ... whose choices often [fly] in the face of fine-dining expectations." Alan Richman describes Schwa's caramelized sweetbread dessert as "the finest dessert ever to emerge from foodstuffs that have no logical reason being used in a dessert." BlackBook Magazine has described Carlson as "culinary genius" and "one of Chicago's best chefs", while Frommer's remarks "Carlson's sensory imagination sometimes rises to the level of sheer poetry." Fellow Chicago chef and mentor, Grant Achatz, sums Carlson up: "This guy can cook. He was one of the most talented and dedicated chefs that I have ever worked with."

In 2006, Food & Wine magazine named Carlson one of the year's top new chefs, remarking "he ingeniously combines a classic Italian cooking sensibility with avant-garde techniques." Also in 2006, Chicago magazine named him "Best Chef" in their annual "Best of the Best" feature. In 2007, he won the Jean Banchet Award for rising chef of the year. In 2008, Maxim described Chicago as "America's mecca for forward-looking cuisine," listing Carlson as one of four Chicago chefs driving cuisine forward. The magazine also listed Carlson's prosciutto consommé as a factor in naming Chicago the year's "Tastiest City".

Carlson has been nominated for top chef honors in the 2010 Jean Banchet Awards.

== Business acumen ==
Despite Carlson's abundant culinary skills, his restaurant Schwa has struggled to stay afloat. Carlson has described the restaurant as living "from paycheck to paycheck". This has been attributed to a complete lack of business acumen, and is a source of frustration for Achatz and Trotter. Despite long reservation waiting lists, on any given night Schwa is usually half empty, partly by choice, partly because Carlson rarely answers the phone. The restaurant's voice mail is frequently full, meaning potential customers are unable to make, or cancel, reservations. Schwa does not have a liquor license, which takes away a large source of potential income (and an even larger source of potential profit). Carlson has claimed limited size of Schwa makes storing wine bottles and glasses difficult, and that it allows him to be educated by the sophisticated customers who bring in their own wines. Achatz called Carlson's decision not to offer wine "stupid", while Trotter said he was "crazy" for "leaving so much money on the friggin' table." For a portion of 2007, Carlson even closed Schwa on Saturdays – traditionally the most profitable day for restaurants – to spend time with his family.

Part of the problem arises from Carlson's lack of focus on money and material possessions. "If he and I and our daughter were living in the woods, he'd be fine," his girlfriend Rachel Brown remarked. Carlson has said he would rather run his business the way he wants than make money. Carlson has repeatedly rejected buyout offers, as well as friendly offers to help him expand, including from Trotter himself, saying that he is happy with the way things are.

Carlson's father, who is 49% owner in Schwa, is currently trying to teach Carlson how to run a business properly. So far the lessons have not yielded significant results. For example, Carlson has lost the business's credit card on multiple occasions.

== Personality and personal life ==
Although he has been described as charismatic, outsiders tend to view Michael Carlson as a recluse. They view him as inconsiderate and incapable of effective communication. Mobil Travel Guide describes him as "the enfant terrible of the Chicago dining world." Friends note that Carlson is technically inept and rarely answers his cell phone or emails.

Carlson's co-workers, however, adore him, and view him as a sort of mad genius, a wild chef with a compassionate heart. Fellow Chicago chef and friend Stephanie Izard remarks "You want to jump into his mind for a day. But you're also afraid you'll run away screaming... He sees things in different ways than anybody else. He's mind-churningly brilliant." Carlson's sous-chef Gaetano Nardulli describes him as "the nicest, most generous person I've met". Schwa chef Jonathan Ory says Carlson is a little nuts, but adds "what makes him nuts is that he's striving to be perfect." Carlson once told an eager young chef who could not afford to eat at Schwa "for you we have a discount price of zero, man."

Carlson is known for his unusually casual style of conversation which entails ending most sentences with "man." GQ magazine described him as "the last hipster dude". If he was not a chef, Carlson says he would be "the world-famous poker player with the cowboy hat and sunglasses sitting in the corner."

Carlson and his girlfriend Rachel Brown live in a three-bedroom apartment in Logan Square. The couple met through Brown's roommate, who was working for Carlson at the time. They have a two-year-old daughter named Lily and a Siberian Husky named Furious George. Carlson spends two hours playing with Lily each morning before he leaves for work, and describes those hours as the best part of his day.

Carlson lists former employee, and current sous-chef of Alinea, Nathan Klingbail as his best friend. Klingbail is the godfather of Lily.
