= Tock (company) =

American online restaurant table reservation company

- Company type: Subsidiary of American Express
- Founded: 2014; 12 years ago
- Founders: Nick Kokonas; Brian Fitzpatrick; Grant Achatz
- Headquarters: Chicago
- Area served: International
- Products: Restaurant reservation app
- Owner: Independent; (2014-21); Squarespace; (2021-24); American Express; (2024–present)
- Website: www.exploretock.com

Tock is an American online restaurant table reservation company. It was founded in 2014 by Nick Kokonas and Brian Fitzpatrick in Chicago, and is now owned by American Express.

== History ==
Tock was founded in 2014 by Nick Kokonas and Brian Fitzpatrick with Grant Achatz. Tock allows restaurants to require customers to pay a deposit to secure a reservation.

During the COVID-19 panic, Tock began facilitating carryout orders.

In 2021, the company was sold to website builder Squarespace.

In 2022, Kokonas left the company. Also in 2022, Tock began offering wine deliveries.

In 2024, American Express announced that it had acquired Tock from Squarespace.
