= Schwa (restaurant) =

Restaurant in Chicago, Illinois, USA

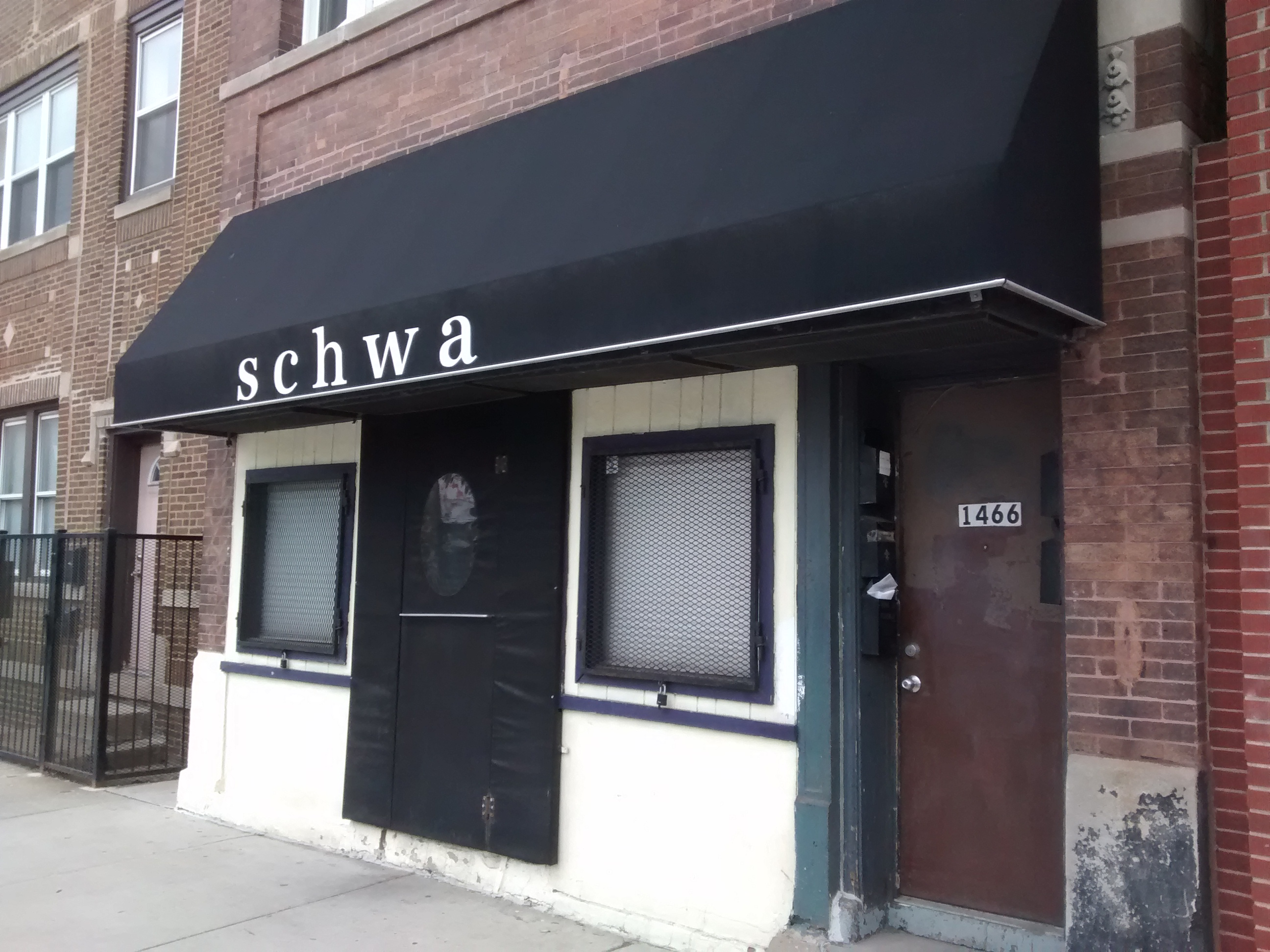
- Front exterior of restaurant
- Interactive map of Schwa

Restaurant information
- Established: 2005
- Owner: Michael Carlson
- Head chef: Michael Carlson
- Food type: New American; Molecular gastronomy
- Dress code: Casual
- Rating: 1 star (Mobil Travel Guide); (Michelin Guide)
- Location: 1466 N. Ashland Ave, Chicago, Cook, Illinois, 60662, United States
- Coordinates: 41°54′32.2″N 87°40′04.3″W
- Seating capacity: 26
- Reservations: Required
- Website: schwarestaurant.com

Schwa is an upscale restaurant run by chef-owner Michael Carlson and chef de cuisine Caleb Trahan. It is located on Ashland Avenue in Wicker Park, Chicago, and is known for its unconventional approach to foodservice. Simple table settings match the building's drab exterior and its tiny 26-seat interior. The restaurant employs no support staff of any kind. Chefs interact directly with customers and are encouraged to act as silly as they wish, as long as they produce top quality food.

Opening in 2005, Schwa quickly drew local and national attention resulting in a large backlog of reservations. In 2007, Schwa was chosen to host the opening night of Charlie Trotter's 20th anniversary celebration. The evening was considered a success, but placed a great deal of stress on Carlson, causing him to close Schwa the following day for a four-month hiatus.

Schwa's menu is known for unusual ingredients and innovative food combinations, such as Carlson's version of pad Thai made with jellyfish tentacles instead of noodles. The quail egg ravioli is considered the restaurant's signature dish.

Schwa has received positive reviews from both local and national critics. It has received three star to three-and-a-half star ratings from the Chicago Tribune, Chicago magazine, and the Mobil Travel Guide. BlackBook Magazine says Schwa features "some of the best food you will ever consume", while famed chef Grant Achatz lists it among his personal favorite places to eat. Several critics have stated that below-average service prevents the restaurant from getting a higher rating. Schwa made Citysearch's Top 10 New Restaurants of 2006 and New York magazine's Grub Street blog ranked it among the five hardest reservations to score in the country. In 2009, Schwa made Frommer's international list of 500 exceptional restaurants.

== Description ==
Schwa is a tiny, 825 square feet (76.6 m^{2}) restaurant located in the Wicker Park neighborhood of Chicago, Illinois. Seating 26, it features what chef Michael Carlson describes as a "pared-down" approach to food and has been described as being on the forefront of a new "molecular gastronomy" style of cooking. The menu is short and constantly changing. Writing for the Chicago Sun Times, Allecia Vemillion calls dinner at Schwa "a window into Carlson's own brain – laser-focused on food with little time for anything else." Unlike typical upscale restaurants, Schwa does not have a wine list, a liquor license, or even stemware.

The pared-down approach can also be seen in the way the business is run. Carlson maintains a staff of only four people to run his restaurant – himself and three other chefs. Schwa has no receptionist, waiters, or other support staff. Schwa's chefs do every job in the restaurant ranging from taking orders to busing tables. Tables are small, simple, and have none of the usual restaurant amenities – no flowers, candles, salt, or pepper. The decor is minimalist, and the kitchen is viewable by patrons in the dining room.

Even the building itself is minimalistic. One observer described it as "so understated that [it] is easy to miss even when one is looking for it", while another said "pass by and you might think it's the home of a batty husband and wife who rarely go outside". The building has a dirty awning and cheap blinds that give the impression the business is closed for remodeling. Schwa is surrounded by dingy buildings and a tire store featuring plastic palm trees.

In line with its minimalistic tendencies, Schwa serves a maximum of 32 customers a night (often leaving the dining room half empty), with staggered seating so that only one table is ordering at any time. Arriving guests are typically greeted with Carlson's trademark salutation: "How you cats doing tonight?" He enjoys casual interaction with his customers, such as calling his dishes "awesome" and "badass". Instead of the soft background music typical of an upscale restaurant, guests are treated to loud hip-hop or heavy metal music. One customer called Schwa "a nice change from all the corporate restaurants".

One complaint many customers have with Schwa is that it is exceedingly difficult to get a reservation. GQ magazine describes a typical customer as having spent weeks trying to get past the always full answering machine that serves as Schwa's primary reservation system. The restaurant attracts an estimated 60 requests for its 26 seats each day, and is notoriously slow at returning phone calls. One couple got so frustrated with the system that they drove down to the restaurant to make a reservation in person. Upon arrival, they were told they had to call it in. Despite their frustration, the couple kept trying and when they finally got in they remarked, "You know what? It was worth it." According to Carlson, most customers' first comment when they arrive at Schwa is either to complain about how difficult it was to get a reservation or to ask for another one. Schwa will not seat customers without a reservation, even if the restaurant is empty.

The work environment at Schwa is also relaxed. Carlson allows his employees to act goofy and talk however they like, as long as they produce high-quality food. There is no dress code; one reporter remarked that the staff looked like a bunch of ecoterrorists. Carlson and his all-male staff work long hours (16- to 18-hour workdays) for below-average pay.

The casual environment at Schwa attracts a diverse clientele, including many local chefs. Carlson says he does not care about etiquette or attire, but will not tolerate rudeness. "If anybody acts as though they expect to be catered to, they're in the wrong place," he says. Carlson adds that he is not afraid to tell a customer off if they deserve it. One reporter observed that Schwa couldn't possibly "do less to preselect customers or filter out undesirable ones." Schwa does not cater to families, offering no highchairs and few tables capable of seating more than two people.

According to Carlson, Schwa struggles to break even in most weeks. Salaries at Schwa are modest, but food costs make up an astronomical 60% of the take-in. Carlson has said he would rather cook and run his restaurant the way he wants than make money, and has rejected buyout offers and calls for expansion.

== History ==
In the fall of 2005, chef Michael Carlson was approached by an old friend who owned a small restaurant named Lovitt. The friend was moving out of state and offered to sell Carlson his location and equipment for a bargain price. With financial support from his father, Carlson took over Lovitt and renamed the restaurant after the neutral, unstressed vowel schwa (ə), a name he says reflects his "pared-down" approach to food.

Schwa opened September 10, 2005, with Carlson promising unstressed food and a laid back attitude. Initially, the restaurant was staffed only by Carlson and his sous chef Nathan Klingbail.

Carlson said his aim with Schwa was to "push the culinary envelope," while using seasonal, organic ingredients. The Chicago Tribune noted Schwa's initial menu did just that, featuring "a soft-boiled organic egg coated in brioche, served with potato puree and Illinois sturgeon caviar". Within weeks, the restaurant had garnered a strong buzz among local foodies. National press attention quickly followed, including Carlson receiving "Best New Chef" honors from Food & Wine magazine, as Schwa earned a reputation for great food and an innovative chef-customer relationship. By early 2007, Schwa was receiving 100 calls a day and had a three-month-long waiting list for reservations.

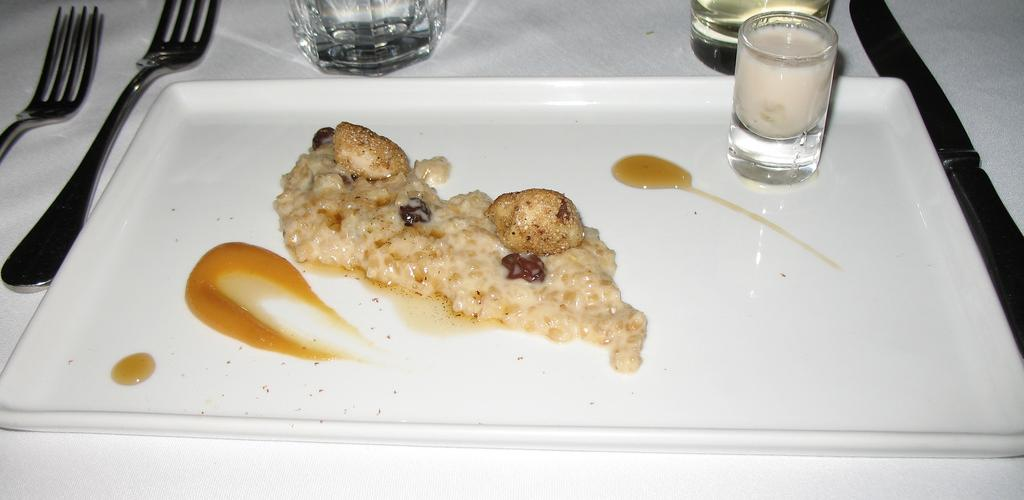
A Schwa original dish, combining oysters with oatmeal and raisins

One food critic attributed Schwa's early attention to its unusual combination of "culinary alchemy" and "straightforward Italian cuisine". Another observer said Schwa was "all about casual sophistication". A Metromix review called the restaurant "Alinea's punk-rock little brother."

On October 5, 2007, Carlson hosted a gathering of world-famous chefs at Schwa as part of Charlie Trotter's 20th anniversary celebration. The evening was a success, but the next morning Carlson abruptly closed Schwa "indefinitely" and left town. He later said that he had burned out from working too hard – 18-hour days were not uncommon – and needed a break and explained that he and his crew had been "talking about closing for weeks, but [knew they] just had to do [the Trotter] dinner" first. Additionally, Schwa was low on cash and struggling to keep the bills paid.

After Schwa closed, about ten different Chicago restaurant owners offered to help Carlson get back on his feet. Carlson declined their help, but reopened Schwa four months later in mid-February 2008, thanks in part to a cash infusion from his father. He hired an additional chef, allowing him to focus more of his attention on the dining room. The menu was redone, with only the three most popular dishes – the quail egg ravioli, the jellyfish pad Thai, and the "pine cone" dessert – returning. The decor was also tweaked. Customers with old, unfulfilled reservations were given the opportunity to try the new Schwa before new reservations were accepted.

Schwa's buzz, and customers, quickly returned. By May 2008, it was routine for the restaurant's voice mail to reach capacity because of the large number of people trying to get reservations (and the restaurant's lack of a receptionist). Shortly after its relaunch, one food critic described Schwa as even better than before, saying it was an "Oscar-worthy redemption story."

Later in 2008, Michelle Obama ate at the restaurant. Carlson joked that it was good thing that Barack did not join her: "I don't think the twenty extra Secret Service agents needed would have fit".

== Menu ==
Schwa offers a three-course dinner for $55 and an eight- to ten-course "degustation" (taster) menu for $110. The latter option could be described as "chef's choice" – on any given night, Carlson prepares courses of his choosing which make up the degustation menu for that evening. Add-ons are also available. Approximately 85% of customers prefer the nine-course option, as it is officially called.

Portions at Schwa are said to be "small and intentionally artful." Dishes available change frequently, as Carlson becomes bored and moves on to something new. "If he's bored with something, no matter how many people love it and demand it, he's done with it," notes his girlfriend.

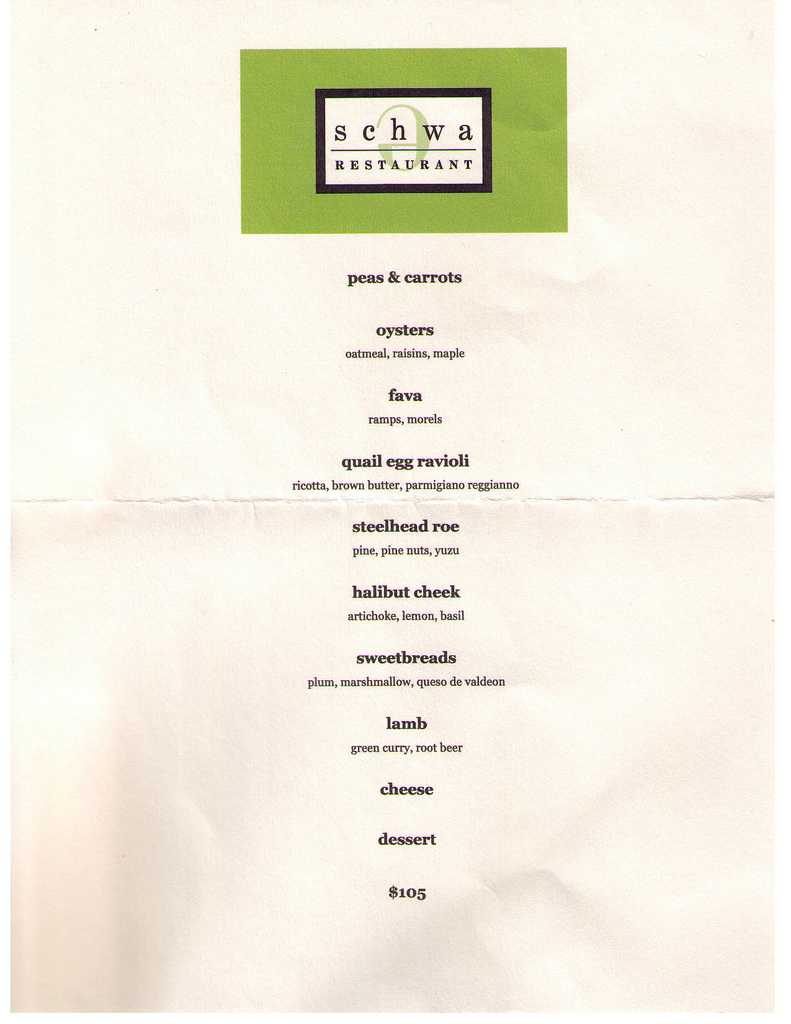
Schwa nine course menu, circa 2007

The menu at Schwa is hard to classify. Schwa chef Jonathan Ory describes it as "modern American", but sous-chef Gaetano Nardulli disagrees: "I don't think it's contemporary American, not at all." Food critic Alan Richman describes it as "one of a kind... earnest, innocent, irresistible, and imaginative". The menu is famous for using sophisticated ingredients to create, as one critic put it, "poetic courses". Surprising ingredients such as jellyfish, roe, tongue, and offal are found in a large number of dishes, as are unusual combinations such as oysters and oatmeal. No portion of the meal is spared from experimentation; tomato sorbet finds its way into the salad, while the consommé soup features melon pieces.

Despite the large number of unusual dishes, Schwa is perhaps best known for Carlson's simple, modern interpretation of Italian classics. Among the most popular dishes is the quail egg ravioli, which has been on the menu since day one. Considered the restaurant's signature dish, it consists of a single ravioli stuffed with quail egg yolk and laced with truffle butter. Schwa is known for emphasizing locally grown produce, and many dishes feature organic ingredients. However, The Local Beet (a website that promotes eating locally grown food) questioned Schwa's commitment to the principle, noting the use of out-of-season strawberries and peas. Most dishes are served with purées.

Also among Schwa's best known dishes is the sweetbread dessert. Combining caramelized sweetbreads with vanilla bean–parsnip custard, the dish has been described as "unequivocally adored". Other notable dishes include pad Thai made with jellyfish instead of noodles, antelope meat dusted with curry powder and coated with white chocolate pudding, "pine cones" (sea urchin ice cream served in pine-flavored cones), and something Carlson calls "onion glue". Innovative drinks, such as beet juice flavored with bacon, are also available. However, Schwa does not serve bread or wine. Customers wishing wine are required to bring their own, although Carlson will offer suggestions of what to bring upon request.

== Reputation ==
Schwa has received positive reviews from the Chicago Sun-Times, Chicago Tribune, Frommer's, and GQ, among others. In 2006, Phil Vettel of the Chicago Tribune described the food as four-star quality, while giving the restaurant an overall rating of three stars (out of four) because of below-average service. Vettel added that nearly every item on the menu is "wonderful". Vettel returned to Schwa after the 2008 relaunch and concluded "Schwa is at least as good as it was in its early days, and probably better". He credited Carlson's increased focus on the dining room for the improvement, and maintained Schwa's three-star rating.

In the Daily Herald, Jennifer Olvera wrote that Schwa's original menu was "a culinary affair" and that seafood-lovers would leave Schwa "gushing". She described dishes as "refreshing and interesting," "visually stunning", and "[begging] to be savored", but was not completely satisfied. She found the portions to be small and pricey, and the service to be rather poor, bordering on rude. "They need to get past the pomp and focus on the issue at hand", she said. A Chicago magazine reviewer remarked that the cooking was "superbly inventive" and that Carlson wowed him with "tasty stunts ... [that] knock your socks off".

Writing about Schwa's post-relaunch menu, Metromix dining producer Chris LaMorte writes, "It's [even] better now – dishes are more focused, yet still inventive. Presentation is better. Quality is more consistent. Chef-servers are (slightly) more approachable." LaMorte did find some fault during his visit, describing the china as "monotonous" and saying the chef-waiters "always dash off too quickly." Martha Bayne of Chicago Reader, also writing about the post-relaunch menu, agreed saying, "the food is better than ever." Bayne called the food "legendary", but did say the jellyfish pad Thai did not "quite live up to their promise". Her favorite dish of the night was the sweetbreads dessert, which she described as "salty, savory, sweet, and deliriously complex, it shoots for the moon and succeeds by confounding every expectation."

Chicago magazine gives Schwa three-and-a-half stars (out of four), saying "count on OK service but brilliant food" and an experience that "defies the norm." Alan Richman of GQ writes "I did not taste one bite of food ... that was prepared imprecisely ... plates are filled with flavors out to the edge of the rim," while BlackBook Magazine claims Schwa features "some of the best food you will ever consume."

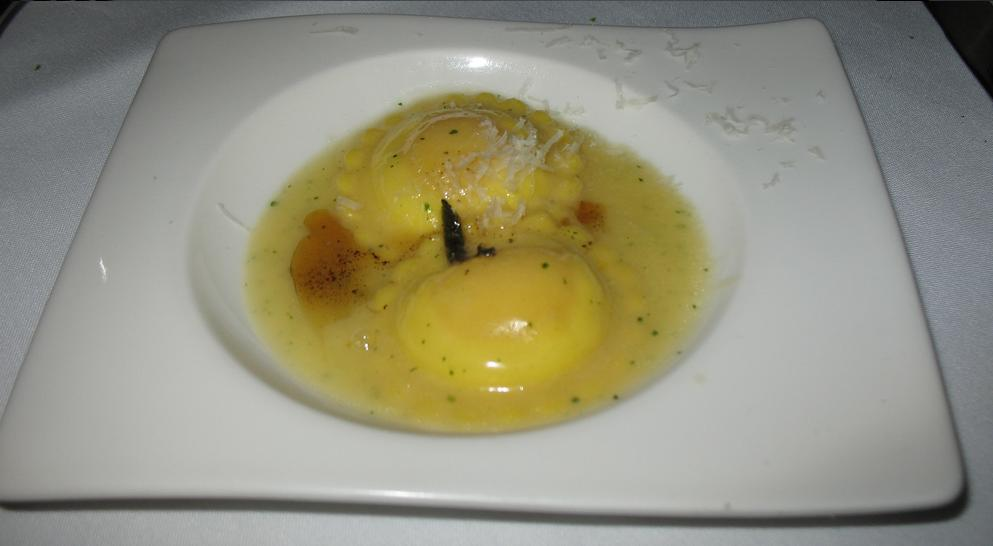
Schwa's trademark dish – quail egg ravioli

Schwa is known as a "chef's restaurant" where local chefs eat on their days off. Paul Kahan remarks, "I think it's so cool that the chefs serve the food", while Carrie Nahabedian emphatically declares "Everyone loves Schwa." Grant Achatz lists Schwa as one of his three favorite places to eat in Chicago.

Locally grown product enthusiast Rob Gardner described Schwa as "a fun restaurant" and a "tremendous value" despite the price. He was, however, disappointed in the restaurant's use of out-of-season produce. "What you will not get... [is] enough local food", he wrote, adding that the out-of-season "pea dish was the worst of the offerings."

In 2009, Schwa made Frommer's international list of 500 exceptional restaurants. Frommer's author Holly Hughes described Schwa's dishes as "miniature works of art" and Carlson's cooking as "innovative". She continued, "Carlson's food just plain tastes good" and "sometimes rises to the level of sheer poetry." That same year, Mobil Travel Guide awarded Schwa three stars (out of five) calling the menu "remarkably innovative" and "knockout" good. The Mobil reviewer did, however, conclude that the food was "a little pricey".

Schwa made Citysearch's "Top 10 New Restaurants" of 2006, placing fourth nationwide, and was named best new restaurant by Newcity. Also in 2006, Schwa was listed as one of Chicago's hottest eating spots by Nation's Restaurant News. In January 2010, Schwa's caramelized sweetbreads made Alan Richman's top five desserts of the year.

In 2008, The New York Times profiled Schwa as one of a handful of restaurants employing an innovative chef-client relationship. The next year, New York magazine's Grub Street blog ranked Schwa among the country's five toughest reservations.

== See also ==
- List of Michelin-starred restaurants in Chicago
- List of New American restaurants
