= Fat Rice =

Restaurant in Chicago

Restaurant information
- Established: 2012
- Closed: 2020
- Chef: Abraham Conlon
- Location: Chicago, Illinois, United States

Fat Rice was an American restaurant inspired by the food and culture of Macau, China. Located in the Logan Square neighborhood of Chicago, Illinois and operating from 2012 to 2020, Fat Rice was known for their Arroz Gordo, a home-style Macanese dish which translates to "fat rice". Then-head chef Abraham Conlon once claimed Fat Rice is the "only restaurant in the world" to serve the dish.

== Background ==
Fat Rice Restaurant, which was founded in 2012, closed down normal operations in March 2020.

== Philanthropy ==
During the COVID-19 pandemic lockdown, Fat Rice owners launched the Fat Rice Community Relief Kitchen to help their staff, other restaurant workers, and Fat Rice customers. Conlon and Lo provided meal kits which were offered at whatever price people could afford to pay. Those meal kits were either delivered or taken out, considering people’s safety. Each meal kit intended to supply three meals to two people contained tofu and vegetable soup, pork meatloaf with mushrooms, and marinated chicken thighs with vegetables.

Their mission was to help flatten the curve of coronavirus outbreak and to help those people who were financially struggling due to restaurant closures.

== Ownership ==
Fat Rice was owned and managed by Abraham Conlon, a James Beard Foundation award winner, and Adrienne Lo, a Chinese American and Chicago native. Both have culinary roots.

Fat Rice also operated an adjacent cocktail bar, called The Ladies' Room and an Asian-inspired pastry shop called The Bakery at Fat Rice.

== Awards ==
- Bon Appétit – #4 Best new Restaurant in the United States, 2013.
- Time Out Chicago – Best New Restaurant, Eat Out Awards, 2013
- Eater – Fat Rice as one of America’s 38 Essential restaurants, 2014
- The Jean Banchet Awards for Culinary Excellence – Best new Restaurant in Chicago, 2016.

== Leadership controversy ==
The restaurant's owners, Abe Conlon and Adrienne Lo, made two Instagram posts in solidarity with those participating in the George Floyd protests in early June 2020. Conlon issued an apology for his behavior on Instagram, and shut Super Fat Rice Mart indefinitely after the criticism.

== See also ==
- List of Michelin Bib Gourmand restaurants in the United States
