= Greg Grossman =

American chef and entrepreneur (born 1995)

- Born: May 25, 1995 (age 30); New York
- Culinary career
- Current restaurants: * Kettlebell Kitchen, New York, NY (2013–present); VYNElife, New York, NY (2016–present); OREYA Hamptons, Southampton, NY (2016–present); Culinaria Group, New York, NY (2012–present); Solstice, Palm Springs, CA (2016–present); Elixir, Palm Springs, CA (2015–present)
- Previous restaurants: * Beautique, Southampton, NY (2015–2016); Georgica, Southampton, NY (2014–2015); Mirage Kitchen, New York, NY (2014–2016); Hudson Market, New York, NY (2015–2016)
- Award(s) won: New York Times 3 Stars 2016 Forbes 30 Under 30 2019

Greg Grossman is an American chef and entrepreneur. He is the President and Founder of Kettlebell Kitchen, a meal delivery service.

At 13, Grossman was a sous chef at the Alinea restaurant. He attended New York University but dropped out to run his business. He was 21 when he bought Oreya and was their executive chef.

Prior to founding Kettlebell Kitchen and VYNElife, Grossman's company Culinaria Group developed and launched the food service at the V Hotel in Palm Springs, California, and operated the Beautique Southampton restaurant in Southampton, New York, as well as several fast casual restaurant chains in New York City.
