= Michael Carlson =

Michael Carlson may refer to:

- Michael Carlson (chef), American chef and restaurateur
- Michael Bear Carson and Suzan Carson, American serial killers
- Michael Carson (author), British author
- Mike Carlson, American pundit of National Football League coverage in the United Kingdom
