= Pasjoli =

French restaurant in Santa Monica, California, U.S.

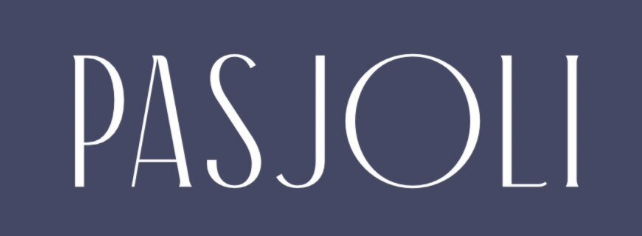
- Interactive map of Pasjoli

Restaurant information
- Head chef: Dave Beran
- Food type: French
- Location: 2732 Main Street, Santa Monica, California, 90405, United States
- Coordinates: 34°0′0.9″N 118°28′55.3″W
- Website: www.pasjoli.com

Pasjoli is a French restaurant in Santa Monica, California. Dave Beran is the chef and owner.

== Reception ==
Time Out Los Angeles has rated Pasjoli four out of five stars. The restaurant was awarded a Michelin star in 2021.

== See also ==
- List of French restaurants
- List of Michelin-starred restaurants in California
- Seline
