= Seline (restaurant) =

Restaurant in Santa Monica, California, U.S.

- Interactive map of Seline

Restaurant information
- Head chef: Dave Beran
- Rating: (Michelin Guide)
- Location: 3110 Main Street, Suite 132, Santa Monica, California, 90405, United States
- Coordinates: 33.9978°N 118.4797°W
- Website: selinerestaurant.com

Seline is a Michelin-starred restaurant in Santa Monica, California, United States.

== See also ==
- List of Michelin-starred restaurants in California
- Pasjoli
