= Arroz gordo =

Macanese rice dish

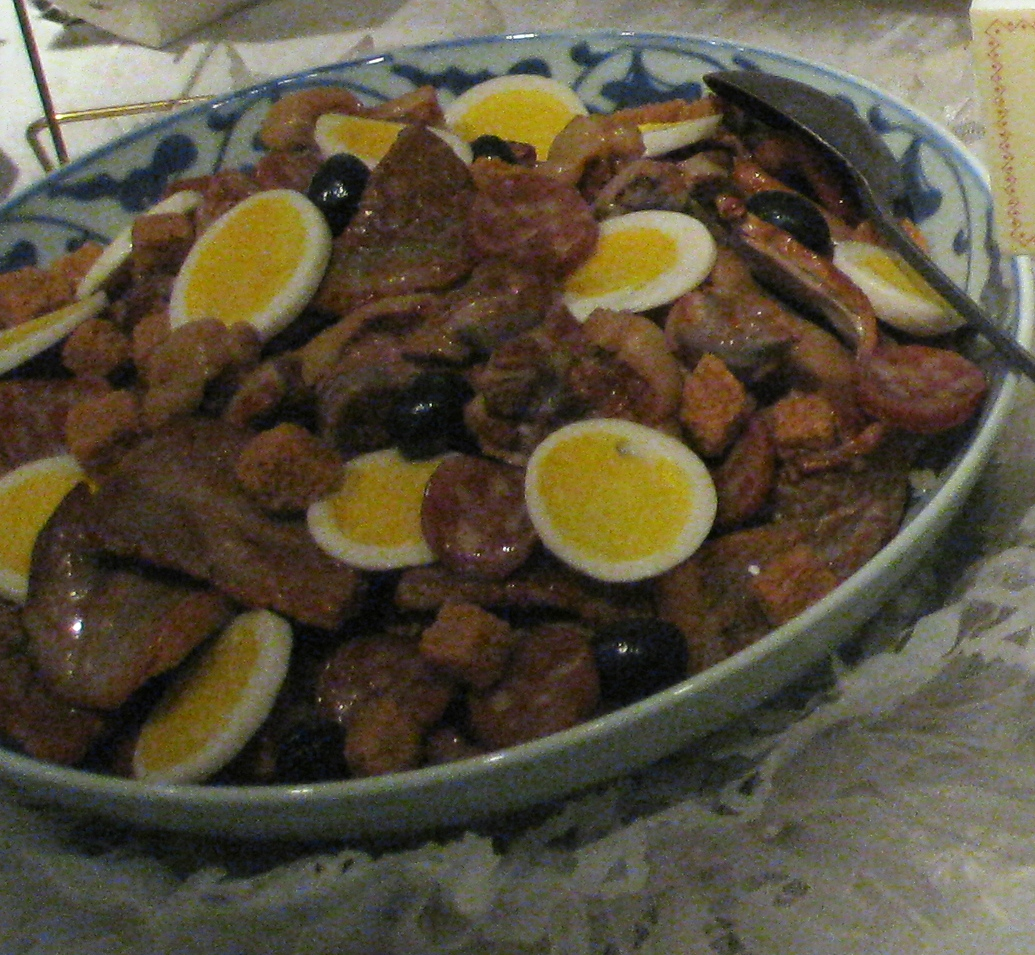
- Place of origin: Macau

Arroz gordo (literally Fat rice) is a rice dish that is often consumed by Eurasian communities in Goa, Macao, Malaysia, and Singapore. It has been likened to a variant of Paella.

== Etymology ==
The gordo in Arroz gordo denotes the richness and expanse of the ingredients.

== History ==
Arroz gordo is often eaten during festive and/or special occasions, such as Christmas.

== Ingredients ==
While different recipes call for different ingredients, Arroz gordo contains rice, chorizo (or sausage), Chicken, Pork and hard-boiled eggs.

The dish can take two days or more to make.

== Curiosities ==
The Chicago restaurant Fat Rice takes its name from the dish.
