= The Aviary (bar) =

Cocktail bar in Chicago, Illinois

- Interactive map of The Aviary

Restaurant information
- Established: 2011
- Owner: Alinea Group
- Location: 955 W. Fulton Market, Chicago, Illinois
- Coordinates: 41.886499°N 87.652015°W
- Website: www.theaviary.com

The Aviary is a craft cocktail bar in Chicago, Illinois. The bar is part the Alinea Group, in of the same "culinary universe" as Alinea, run by Michelin-starred chef Grant Achatz.

The Aviary is known as one of the world's best bars. It is centered around molecular gastronomy, with prominent scientific and culinary influence in its drinks.

== Attributes and history ==
The bar takes the food world's fine-dining approach into its bar program, with elements of molecular gastronomy, custom glassware and other serviceware, and an evolving seasonal menu, all allowing for unique drinks which have changed how drinks are presented worldwide. The bar also includes a separate room where an "ice chef" prepares custom ice cubes for drinks. The bartenders are treated like chefs, and work in a fenced-in "cocktail kitchen".

The bar is within the restaurant Next, in Chicago's Fulton Market District, part of the West Loop neighborhood. Another bar in the space, The Office, is a 22-seat speakeasy-style bar situated directly beneath The Aviary.

The Aviary has several ordering methods, including an à la carte menu, a three-course cocktail tasting, a five-course tasting, and a seven-course "kitchen table experience". The three-course menu starts with delicate drinks and progresses to richer items. The five-course menu includes food with the drinks, prepared by the chefs and bar team to accompany the cocktails. The seven-course tasting is served in the restaurant's kitchen, and includes food and reportedly the best cocktails The Aviary can offer.

The bar is considered a destination cocktail establishment.

== History ==
The Aviary bar opened in 2011.

In 2017, the bar released its first cookbook, The Aviary Cocktail Book, self-published and funded via Kickstarter. The funding move was reported by Eater as unusual given that publishers would have accepted the work, and Achatz has already published several books through reputable publishers. Business partner Nick Kokonas cited the financial benefits for Aviary; that traditional publication would ensure high production costs and profits divided between the publisher and author, making the books little more than "good publicity". Kokonos wrote an article for Medium to explain his decision, saying in part that publishers do not offer cookbook authors good deals.

In 2019, one of the bar's employees spit on Eric Trump, businessman and son of then-U.S. president Donald Trump. The employee was arrested and detained for two hours, and immediately put on leave; Trump declined to file charges. Chicago mayor Lori Lightfoot denounced the incident as "repugnant", regardless of any politics. The bar released a statement that day calling the incident "unfortunate" and something that should not happen, and that the company would investigate.

=== Second location ===
From 2017 to 2020, The Aviary and The Office opened secondary locations in New York City, on the 35th floor of the Mandarin Oriental hotel, taking over and doing a complete remodel of the former Lobby Lounge and MoBar spaces. The bars had been in development for three prior years. The space was noted for its "sweeping" view of Central Park, what The New York Times referred to as a perch for a bird's-eye view, making The Aviary finally live up to its name.

The two bars closed in 2020, just prior to the COVID-19 pandemic.

== Reception ==
The bar has won several awards and titles, including being named 13th best bar in the world, in The World's 50 Best Bars publication in 2014. It made 39th in 2016. It won a James Beard Foundation Award, "Outstanding Bar Program", in 2013.

In 2017, Eater titled it "Chicago's coolest cocktail bar" and one of the city's essential bars. The publication also stated that The Aviary is considered one of the best bars in the world.

TimeOut reviewed it with four out of five stars in 2015.
