= Dialogue (restaurant) =

Defunct restaurant in Santa Monica, California, U.S.

- Interactive map of Dialogue

Restaurant information
- Established: September 2017
- Closed: November 7, 2020; 5 years ago
- Previous owner: Dave Beran
- Food type: American
- Rating: (Michelin Guide)
- Location: 1315 3rd Street Promenade, Santa Monica, California, 90401, United States
- Coordinates: 34.0166°N 118.4970°W

Dialogue was a Michelin-starred restaurant in Santa Monica, California. The restaurant served American cuisine, and closed in 2020.

== See also ==
- List of Michelin-starred restaurants in California
