= Everett E. Vokes =

American oncologist

- Born: New York City, USA
- Known for: Treating Grant Achatz's cancer
- Spouse: Tamara Jankovic Vokes

Academic background
- Education: MD, University of Bonn

Everett E. Vokes is an American oncologist. He is the John E. Ultmann Professor, chair of the Department of Medicine, and physician-in-chief at the University of Chicago Medical Center. In this role, he pioneered the combination radiation and chemotherapy as first-line treatment for head and neck cancer.

== Early life and education ==
Vokes was born in New York City where his parents lived and studied at Juilliard School. His family shortly thereafter relocated to Nashville, Tennessee, and at the age of four, his parents divorced. As his mother’s family were German immigrants, he went with his mother to Bonn, Germany so she could continue to work as a pianist. He earned his medical degree at the University of Bonn and returned to North America for his residency in internal medicine at Ravenswood Hospital Medical Center in Chicago and at the University of Southern California. During his time as a medical fellow, he began to believe "the answer [to cure cancer] might lie in giving patients chemotherapy and radiation simultaneously."

== Career ==
Upon completing his formal education, Vokes arrived at the University of Chicago Medical Center (UChicago Medicine) as a hematology/oncology fellow in 1983 and was promoted to professor in 1995. As an oncologist at UChicago Medicine, Vokes served as the principal investigator of the University of Chicago's National Cancer Institute Phase II program, supporting numerous phase II studies of novel agents in a network of institutions throughout the Midwest. His work has shown that intense treatment combining radiation and chemotherapy can bring locally advanced head and neck cancer under control and improve survival.

Due to his growing reputation, Vokes and a team of scientists helped to treat chef Grant Achatz's stage 4 squamous cell carcinoma of the mouth. On December 18, 2007, Achatz credited his remission due to aggressive protocol of chemotherapy and radiation therapy administered under the direction of Drs. Vokes, Blair and Haraf. Following this, Vokes was appointed chairman of the Department of Medicine at UChicago Medicine after an intense process of review and consultation with medical leaders within the institution and across the nation. Later in the year, he was also named to two leadership positions at UChicago Medicine; he was named interim chief executive officer of the Medical Center and Dean of the Biological Sciences Division and the Pritzker School of Medicine after James L. Madara stepped down. Vokes is also an elected member of the American Society for Clinical Investigation and was one of two recipients of the new Translational Research Professorship from the American Society of Clinical Oncology. Later, he was a recipient of a Francis L. Lederer Foundation grant for research on the malignancies of the upper aerodigestive tract.

As an oncologist at UChicago Medicine, Vokes formally served as the leader of the Respiratory Committee of the Alliance and sat on various editorial boards for several journals. He also served as chair of the Annual Meeting Education Committee, Annual Meeting Scientific Program Committee, and a member of the Conquer Cancer Development and Fundraising Committee, and the Cancer.Net Editorial Board. In 2013, Vokes was named a member of OncLive's inaugural class of “Giants of Cancer Care" for his groundbreaking research into head and neck cancers. They specifically highlighted how his work has shown that intense treatment combining radiation and chemotherapy can bring locally advanced head and neck cancer under control and improve survival. A few years later, he was elected to serve as ASCO's president for the 2021-22 term.
