= Next (restaurant) =

- Interactive map of Next

Restaurant information
- Established: 2011
- Owners: Grant Achatz; Nick Kokonas
- Head chef: Grant Achatz
- Food type: Variable
- Rating: (Michelin Guide)
- Location: 953 W. Fulton Market, Chicago, Illinois, United States
- Coordinates: 41°53′11″N 87°39′07″W
- Website: NextRestaurant.com

Next is a restaurant in Chicago. It opened April 6, 2011. The restaurant received media interest due to chef Grant Achatz's success at his first restaurant, Alinea, as well as its unique "ticketed" format: Next sells pre-priced tickets for specific dates and times in a similar fashion to the way theater, concert and sporting event tickets are sold.

== Property ==
Next is located in Chicago's historic Fulton Market, just north of the West Loop's "Restaurant Row" on Randolph Street.

Next's operation also includes two on-site bars: The Aviary, previously headed by Charles Joly, and presently headed by Micah Melton, and The Office, an invite-only speakeasy-format bar that seats 14 and is located behind an unmarked metal door in the basement of the building.

== Menus ==
Rather than stick with one type of cuisine, Next completely changes its style every few months, focusing on a different time period, parts of the world, or various abstract themes for each "season" of its menu. While themes for the year are often released at the end of the previous season, menu development for each of the season's themes begins in final weeks of the previous menu. Executive Chef Ed Tinoco and Grant Achatz head this process.

These are the past, present, and (known) future menus of Next Restaurant:

Start date	End date	Theme
April 6, 2011	June 30, 2011	"Paris: 1906"
July 8, 2011	October 9, 2011	"Thailand"
October 22, 2011	January 29, 2012	"Childhood"
February 8, 2012	May 27, 2012	"El Bulli"
June 2, 2012	September 9, 2012	"Sicily"
September 15, 2012	December 31, 2012	"kaiseki"
January 9, 2013	April 28, 2013	"The Hunt"
May 8, 2013	August 24, 2013	"Vegan"
August 31, 2013	December 31, 2013	"Bocuse d'Or"
January 2014	April 2014	"Chicago Steakhouse"
May 2014	August 2014	"Chinese:Modern"
September 2014	December 2014	"Trio, January 20, 2004"
January 2015	May 2015	"Bistro"
May 2015	September 2015	"Tapas"
September 2015	December 2015	"Terroir"
January 2016	March 2016	"The Alps"
April 2016	August 2016	"Tour of South America"
September 2016	December 2016	"The French Laundry: October 28th, 1996"
January 2017	April 2017	"Ancient Rome"
May 2017	August 2017	"Hollywood"
August 2017	December 2017	"World's 50 Best"
January 2018	April 2018	"French: Cuisine Classique"
April 2018	June 2018	"French: Cuisine Nouvelle"
June 2018	September 2018	"Alinea: 2005-2010"
October 2018	January 2019	"Alinea: 2011-2015"
January 2019	April 2019	"Silk & Spice"
May 2019	August 2019	"Italia"
August 2019	January 2020	"José Andrés: World Central Kitchen"
January 2020	April 2020	“Tokyo”
August 2020	August 2020	“Mexico City "
September 2020	January 2021	“The Fat Duck "
January 2021	December 2021	“10th Anniversary Menu "
January 2022	October 2022	“World’s Fair Menu”
October 2022	January 2023	“Seafood”
January 2023	April 2023	“Paris 1906”
August 2023	January 2024	"Tuscany"
January 2024	April 2024	"Julia Child"
May 2024	September 2024	"Bobbie Flay"
September 2024	December 2024	"Charlie Trotter"

== Tickets ==
Through the "Childhood" menu, Next sold tickets through their website in batches. Several tables would be opened up, and announcements were made on their Facebook and Twitter pages when tickets were available. The tickets sold rapidly. Next tickets are transferable, but not refundable or exchangeable. This has sparked the creation of a secondary market for the tickets, which has resulted in reports of people scalping the tickets for several times their face value.

In an attempt to eliminate the secondary market on Next tickets, the sales model was changed in 2012 to follow a season ticket model, where in-advance tickets were only available if patrons purchased tickets for one meal from each of the restaurant's seasonal menus being offered for the year. Additional benefits (including access to the invite-only The Office) were given along with the season tickets with the stipulation that if the tickets were sold, these additional benefits would be lost. For the 2012 season, the wait list during ticket purchasing reached a queue of over 6,600 people. With just over 900 packages available in total for the year, the people who were able to buy the tickets were in line within 8–10 seconds of their release.

Next also releases "Same-Day" tickets via their Facebook page. They guarantee there will be at least one table available via Facebook every day they are open.

Next, Alinea, and The Aviary, each in their own right, served as a testing and development ground for Nick Kokonas's proprietary ticketing system. Kokonas's system allows for dynamic pricing for restaurant tickets/reservations. The system, now held under a new company called Tock, is being commercially offered to restaurants around the country and the world. Some of the earliest adopters include, Thomas Keller's The French Laundry and Per Se and Daniel Patterson's Coi.

== Awards ==
- AAA 4-Diamond rating
- Forbes Travel Guide 4-Star rating
- Michelin Star, 2020 - 2024
- 50 Best Restaurants in Chicago: Zagat, 2017
- Best Restaurant Service in Chicago: Zagat, 2016
- Elite Traveler Top 100 Restaurants in The World- The list. #38, 2016
- Elite Traveler Top 100 Restaurants in The World- The list. #41, 2018
- James Beard Foundation Awards - Best New Restaurant, 2012
- Best New Restaurant: Jean Banchet Awards, 2011
- Best Fine Dining: Jean Banchet Awards, 2011

== See also ==
- List of Michelin-starred restaurants in Chicago
