= Nick Kokonas =

American restaurant executive and author

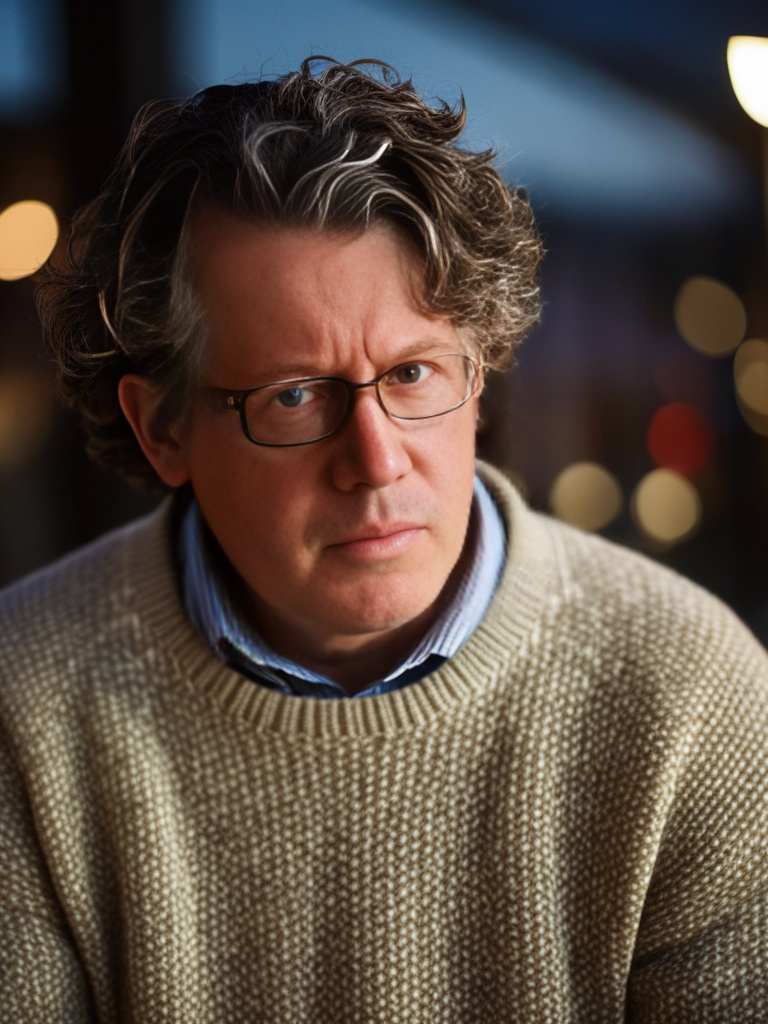

Nick Kokonas is an American restaurant businessman and author. He is known for his partnership with chef Grant Achatz, owning Chicago restaurants Next, Alinea, and The Aviary, and for founding the reservation business Tock.

== Early life and education ==
Born and raised in Northbrook IL, the only child of Greek parents, Kokonas graduated from Colgate University with a degree in philosophy.

== Career ==
Prior to meeting Grant Achatz and forming their business partnership, Kokonas was the owner of a financial firm for 10 years, and was an investor and entrepreneur.

Kokonas's restaurants Next, Alinea, and The Aviary served as a testing and development ground for his proprietary ticketing system, Tock. Kokonas's system allows for dynamic pricing for restaurant tickets and reservations. Some of the earliest adopters include Thomas Keller's The French Laundry and Per Se, and Daniel Patterson's Coi. In 2021 Tock was acquired by Squarespace for over $400 million.

Alinea has been named the best restaurant in North America by Gourmet Magazine, the World's 50 Best, and Trip Advisor. Next, a shape-shifting restaurant with new menus every 3 or 4 months, won a James Beard award for Best New Restaurant in America and was given a 4-star rating from the Chicago Tribune for each of 21 different menus.

Kokonas has been a guest on podcasts including the Tim Ferriss Show.

== Personal life ==
Kokonas and his wife, Dagmara, have two sons.

== Published works ==
- Grant Achatz and Nick Kokonas, Life, on the Line: A Chef's Story of Chasing Greatness, Facing Death, and Redefining the Way We Eat March 6, 2012 ISBN 1592406971
