= Jean Banchet =

French-American chef (1941–2013)

Jean Banchet (March 7, 1941 — November 24, 2013) was a French-American chef who popularized French cuisine through his Wheeling, Illinois restaurant, Le Francais, which opened in early 1973 and was one of the highest rated French restaurants of its era in America. The annual Jean Banchet Awards, first given out in 2002, are named after Banchet and are given to Chicago-area chefs and other hospitality workers.

Le Francais was part of the nouvelle cuisine movement.

In October, 2013, he was inducted into the Chicago Chefs Hall of Fame.

Banchet died on November 24, 2013, of pancreatic cancer in Jupiter, Florida at his home a mere three weeks after receiving the diagnosis.
