= Grant Achatz =

American chef and restaurateur

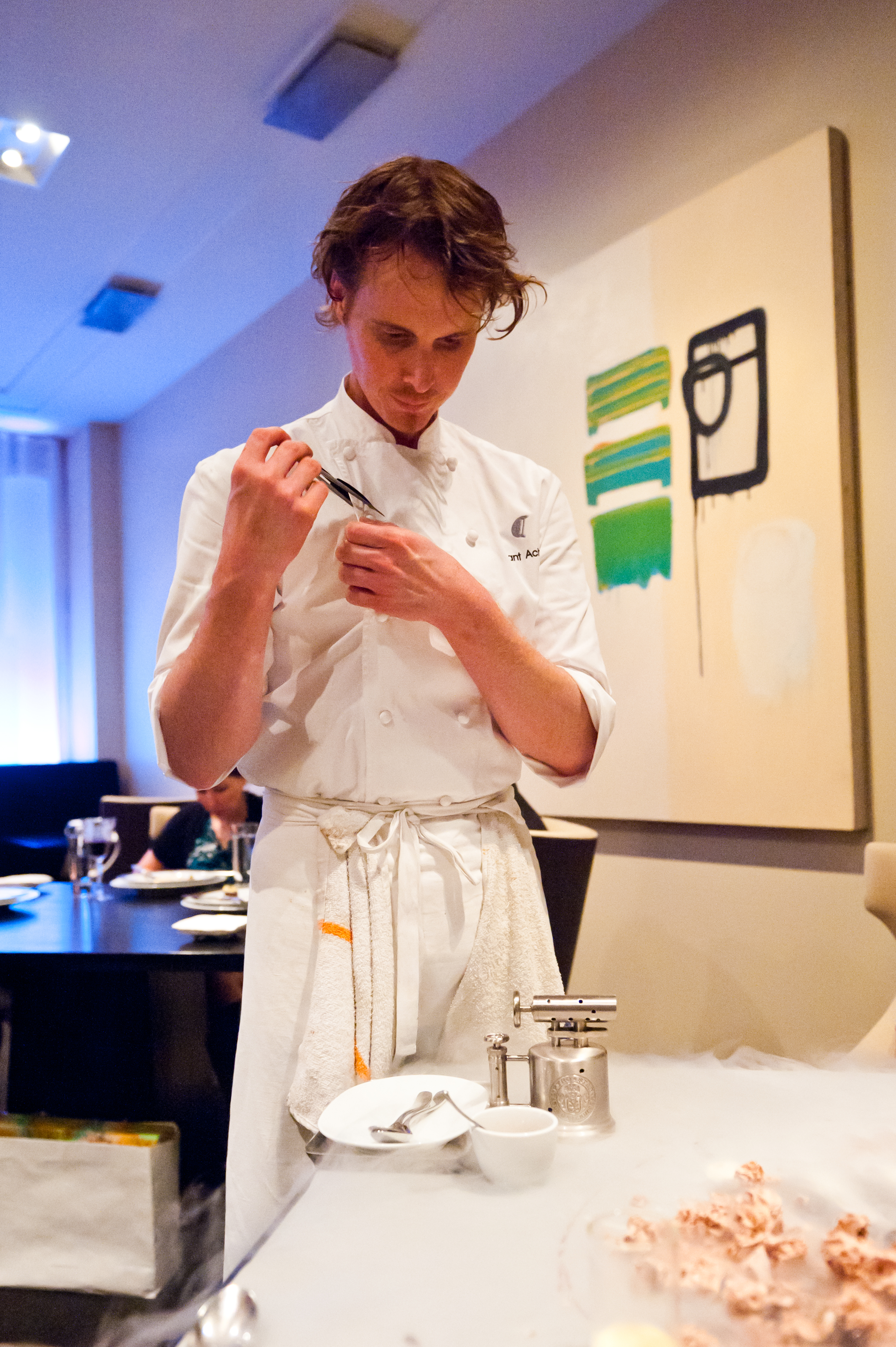
- Grant Achatz preparing a dish tableside at Alinea in 2011
- Born: April 25, 1974 (age 52); St. Clair, Michigan, US
- Education: The Culinary Institute of America
- Culinary career
- Cooking style: Molecular gastronomy
- Ratings
- Michelin stars; AAA Motor Club
- Current restaurants
- Alinea; Next; Fire
- Previous restaurants
- Charlie Trotter's; The French Laundry; Trio (2001–2005)
- Awards
- Food & Wine – Best New Chef, 1998; James Beard Foundation Award – Rising Star Chef of the Year, 2003; Jean Banchet Award – Best Celebrity Chef, 2007; James Beard Foundation Award – Best Chef: Great Lakes, 2007; James Beard Foundation Award – Outstanding Chef, 2008; James Beard Foundation Award – Book Award: Cooking from a Professional Point of View, 2009; Time 100, 2011
- Website: www.alinearestaurant.com

Grant Achatz (/ˈækɪts/ AK-its) (born April 25, 1974) is an American chef and restaurateur often recognized for his contributions to molecular gastronomy or progressive cuisine. Achatz has won numerous awards, including Food and Wine's "best new chefs" award in 1998, "Rising Star Chef of the Year Award" for 1999, "Best Chef in the United States" for 1998, a 2003 "Who's Who Inductee" from the James Beard Foundation, and a Jean Banchet Lifetime Achievement Award in 2026.

== Early life and education ==
Achatz was born on April 25, 1974, in St. Clair, Michigan. He grew up in a family of restaurateurs. His parents, Grant Achatz Sr. and Barbara Jean Achatz, owned and operated the Achatz Depot (later renamed the Achatz Family Restaurant). It was a casual diner specializing in breakfast staples and comfort food like burgers and meatloaf. His interest in the culinary arts began early, as he spent much of his childhood in the family kitchen, eventually working as a short-order cook flipping eggs during his teenage years.

In 1992, Achatz moved to New York to attend The Culinary Institute of America in Hyde Park. While at the CIA, he focused on building a classical foundation, which he later cited as essential for his transition into the complex techniques of modernist cuisine. He graduated in 1994 with an Associate in Occupational Studies degree.

== Career ==
Following graduation in 1994, Achatz moved to Chicago and landed a position at the renowned Charlie Trotter's. Later, he worked at Thomas Keller's highly acclaimed restaurant, The French Laundry, in Yountville, California. Achatz spent four years at The French Laundry, rising to the position of sous chef.

In 2001, Achatz advanced to position of Executive Chef at Trio in Evanston, Illinois, which at the time of his arrival had a four-star rating from the Mobil Travel Guide. Over the next three years, with Achatz at the helm, Trio's reputation soared, and in 2004 the restaurant was rewarded with a fifth star from Mobil, becoming one of just 13 restaurants so honored at the time.

In 2005, Achatz went out on his own, opening Alinea in Chicago's Lincoln Park neighborhood with Nick Kokonas. The restaurant is located up the block from the famed Steppenwolf Theatre Company and is housed in a modest gray brick building which bears no external markings beyond its street number. Inside, the restaurant has no bar, no lobby and seats just 64 guests. Achatz serves diners a small-course tasting menu, consisting of approximately 18 courses. After less than two years of operation, the Mobil Travel Guide bestowed its Five Star Award on Alinea, making Alinea one of just 16 restaurants nationwide to rate five stars for 2007.

In October 2006, Gourmet magazine named Alinea the best restaurant in America in its feature on "America's Top 50 Restaurants". In 2007, Restaurant magazine added Alinea to its list of the 50 best restaurants in the world at number 36, the highest new entry of the year. Alinea moved up the list to number 21, to number 10 in 2009, then to number 7 for 2010, when it was also the highest ranked North American restaurant honored. Alinea maintained its top North American position for 2011, while moving up one position overall to 6th best restaurant in the world. In 2012, Alinea came down one spot on the list. Per Se was in 6th place, thus making Alinea the 2nd best restaurant in the U.S. and 7th overall.

In November 2009, Achatz and his Alinea team designed the menu for Ikarus, a restaurant in Salzburg, Austria, which brings in a top chef from a different restaurant each month to design the menu for that month and train the staff.

Alinea was awarded three stars in the 2011 Michelin Guide for Chicago. It was repeated in 2012 when Alinea was the only restaurant to receive three stars in the 2012 Michelin Guide for Chicago.

Achatz's other restaurants include Next, a restaurant that uses a unique ticketing system in Chicago, and The Aviary, a bar. Roister Chicago, a casual West Loop concept, The Office, a speakeasy cocktail bar located under The Aviary bar, and The Aviary/ Office NYC located in the Mandarin Oriental, New York.

Reservations for Achatz's restaurant, Next, are so sought after that tickets could be found on Craigslist for up to $500 per person. In February 2012, Achatz held a Dutch auction for tickets to Next's El Bulli-inspired menu, raising over $275,000 for charity in just two days. Auction prices varied between $4,000 and $5,000 for parties of two.

Achatz has also served as a coach for the biennial Bocuse d'Or culinary competition in Lyon, France.

In 2016 Achatz and partner Nick Kokonas closed Alinea for a complete renovation and overhaul of the food, space, and experience. During the closure, Achatz and his team held two consecutive multi-week pop-up experiences in Madrid, Spain, and Miami, Florida.

== Books ==
In October 2008, Achatz and co-author Nick Kokonas published Alinea, a hardcover coffee table book featuring more than 100 of the restaurant's recipes. The book's narrative follows life in the kitchen for Achatz and his crew, and includes more than 400 behind-the-scenes photographs by Lara Kastner.

In June 2009, Achatz and Kokonas sold Life, On the Line, their dual-voiced recount of their collaboration on Alinea and Achatz's battle with cancer to Gotham Books. The book was released on March 3, 2011.

Kokonas and Achatz have also released two digital cookbooks from Next Restaurant, one on the Apple iBook platform, and one in a more universal PDF format. As in the style of the Alinea cookbook, both books provide the exact recipes used during the Paris 1906 and Tour of Thailand menus, without making adjustments for the average home cook. While the Paris 1906 book was released for purchase via iTunes, Tour of Thailand was released on a pay-what-you-want model on Next's ticketing site.

== Health issues ==
On July 23, 2007, Achatz announced that he had been diagnosed with stage 4 squamous cell carcinoma of the mouth, which spread to his lymph nodes. Initially, Achatz was told that radical surgery was necessary, which would remove part of his mandibular anatomy, including part of his tongue and large swaths of neck tissue. Later, University of Chicago physicians prescribed an alternative course of chemotherapy and radiation treatments. This led to full remission, albeit with some side effects including a transitory loss of his sense of taste, which eventually returned. On December 18, 2007, Achatz announced that he was cancer-free. He credited the aggressive protocol of chemotherapy and radiation administered at the University of Chicago Medical Center for driving his cancer into full remission. The treatment regimen, administered under the direction of Drs. Everett E. Vokes, Blair and Haraf at University of Chicago, did not require radical invasive surgery on Achatz's tongue.

== Personal life ==
Achatz has two sons with Angela Snell; the couple divorced in 2006. The name "Keller" was chosen to honor Achatz's mentor Thomas Keller.

== In popular culture ==
On May 27, 2016, Achatz appeared on season two of the Netflix series Chef's Table. In 2018, Achatz appeared as a judge on the Netflix series The Final Table. In 2024 he appeared in a cameo role alongside chefs Daniel Boulud, Thomas Keller, Malcolm Livingston, Christina Tosi, Genie Kwon, Wylie Dufresne, Anna Posey, and Rosio Sanchez on the season three finale of The Bear. He was one of the judges in the final episode of the 2025 TV series Next Gen Chef.

== Awards ==
- Best New Chefs, Food & Wine, 2002
- Best Restaurant in America, Gourmet, 2006
- 40 Top Chicago Restaurants Ever, Chicago, #1, 2010
- AAA Five Diamond Award, AAA, 2007–2017
- Mobil Five Star Award, Mobil Travel Guide, 2007–2017
- Jean Banchet Award – Lifetime Achievement, 2026
- Jean Banchet Award – Best Celebrity Chef, 2007
- Jean Banchet Award – Best Fine Dining, 2007
- The S. Pellegrino World's 50 Best Restaurants, #36, 2007
- The S. Pellegrino World's 50 Best Restaurants, Highest New Entry, 2007
- The S. Pellegrino World's 50 Best Restaurants, #21, 2008
- The S. Pellegrino World's 50 Best Restaurants, #10, 2009
- The S. Pellegrino World's 50 Best Restaurants, #7, 2010
- The S. Pellegrino World's 50 Best Restaurants, The Acqua Panna Best Restaurant In North America, 2010
- The S. Pellegrino World's 50 Best Restaurants, #6, 2011
- The S. Pellegrino World's 50 Best Restaurants, The Acqua Panna Best Restaurant In North America, 2011
- The S. Pellegrino World's 50 Best Restaurants, Chefs' Choice Award, 2013
- The S. Pellegrino World's 50 Best Restaurants, #9, 2014
- The S. Pellegrino World's 50 Best Restaurants, #26, 2015
- The S. Pellegrino World's 50 Best Restaurants, #15, 2016
- The S. Pellegrino World's 50 Best Restaurants, #21, 2017
- The S. Pellegrino World's 50 Best Restaurants, #34, 2018
- The S. Pellegrino World's 50 Best Restaurants, #37, 2019
- James Beard Foundation Award – Rising Star Chef of the Year, 2003
- James Beard Foundation Award – Best Chef: Great Lakes, 2007
- James Beard Foundation Award – Outstanding Chef, 2008
- James Beard Foundation Award – Book Award: Cooking from a Professional Point of View, 2009
- James Beard Foundation Award – Outstanding Service Award, 2010 2016
- James Beard Foundation Awards – Outstanding Restaurant, 2016
- Top Service Award (Chicago), Zagat Survey, 2006
- Zagat Guide "Excellent" Rating, 2008
- 3 Michelin Stars, 2011
- 3 Michelin Stars, 2012
- 3 Michelin Stars, 2013
- 3 Michelin Stars, 2014
- 3 Michelin Stars, 2015
- 3 Michelin Stars, 2016
- 3 Michelin Stars, 2017
- 3 Michelin Stars, 2018
- 3 Michelin Stars, 2019
- 3 Michelin Stars, 2020
- 3 Michelin Stars, 2021
- 3 Michelin Stars, 2022
- 3 Michelin Stars, 2023
- 3 Michelin Stars, 2024
- The 2011 Time 100
