= Alinea (restaurant) =

Fine dining restaurant in Chicago, Illinois

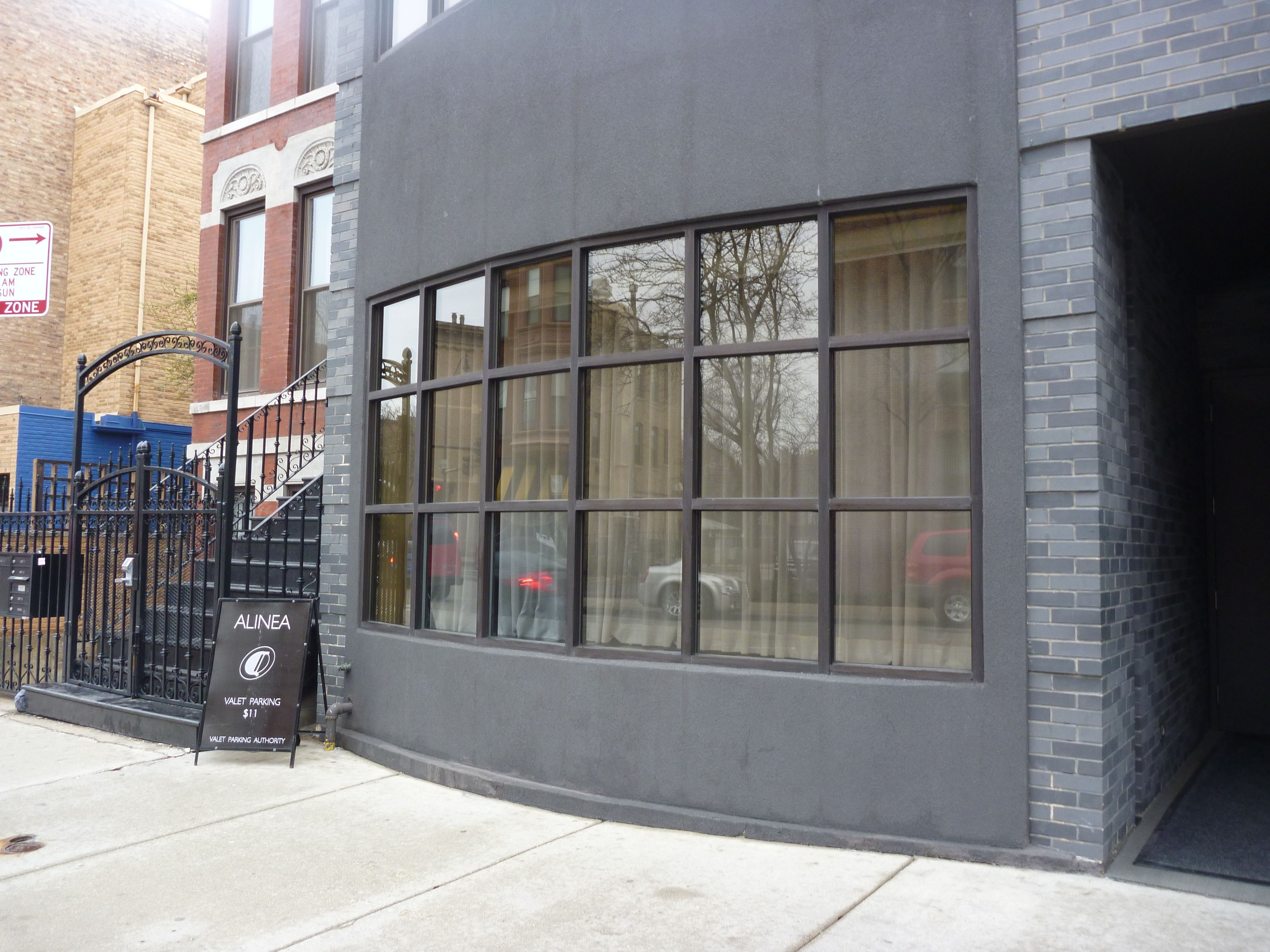
- Interactive map of Alinea

Restaurant information
- Established: May 4, 2005; 21 years ago
- Owners: Grant Achatz; Nick Kokonas
- Head chef: Grant Achatz
- Food type: Molecular gastronomy
- Rating: (Michelin Guide)
- Location: 1723 North Halsted St., Chicago, Illinois, United States
- Coordinates: 41°54′48″N 87°38′54″W
- Website: www.alinearestaurant.com

Alinea is a restaurant in Chicago, Illinois, United States. It is owned by chef Grant Achatz and Nick Kokonas, and known for its "maximalist modernist cooking". From 2011 to 2024, Alinea was awarded three stars by the Michelin Guide; it was downgraded to two Michelin stars in 2025.

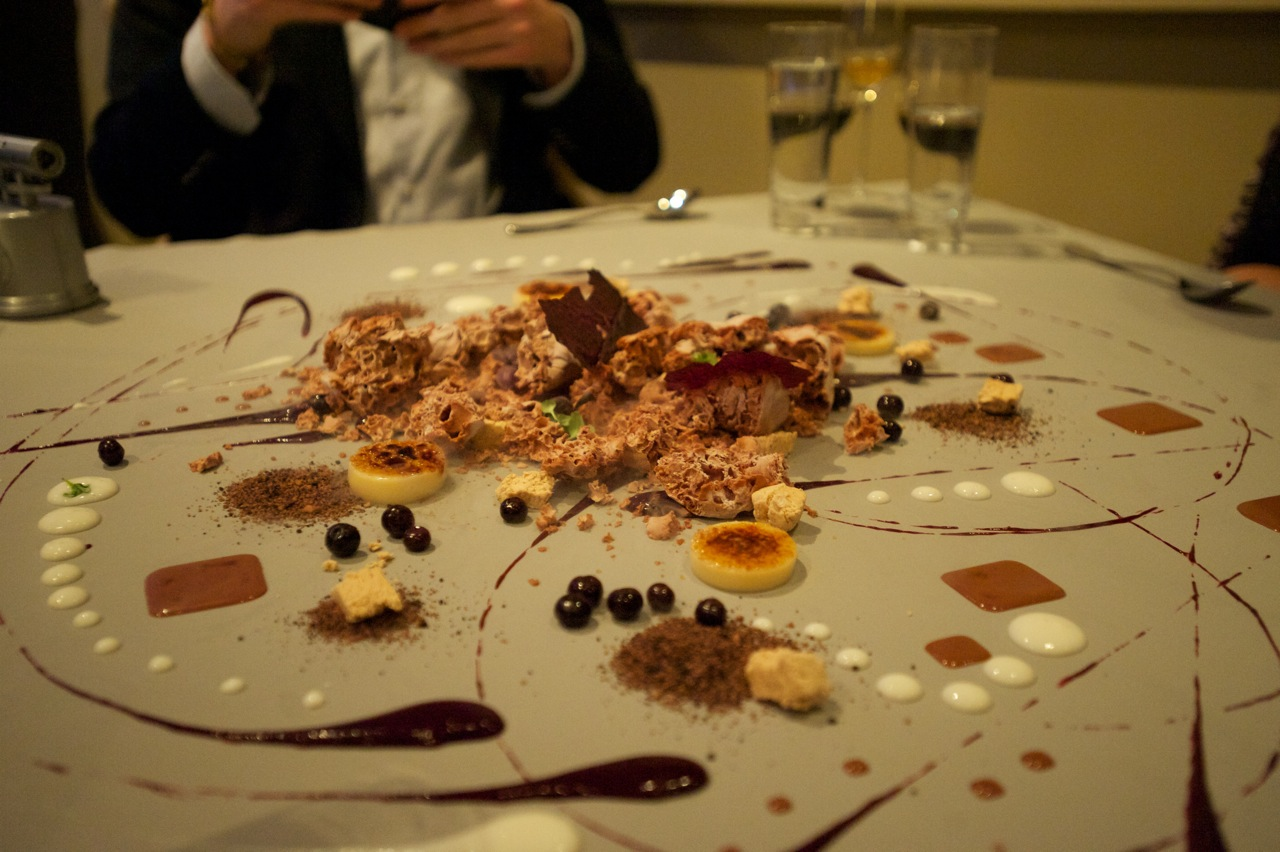
Dessert course

== History ==
The restaurant opened on May 4, 2005, and takes its name from the symbol alinea, which is featured as a logo. Co-owner Nick Kokonas wrote of the restaurant's name, Alinea literally means "off the line". The restaurant's symbol, more commonly known as the pilcrow, indicates the beginning of a new train of thought, or a new paragraph. The symbol has a double meaning: on one hand, Alinea claims to represent a new train of thought about food, but as a restaurant, everything still has to come "off the line".

In October 2008, chef and owner Grant Achatz and co-author Kokonas published Alinea, a hardcover coffee-table book featuring more than 100 of the restaurant's recipes.

In January 2016, the Alinea Group, the owner of Alinea, bought Moto restaurant in Chicago.

On January 1, 2016, Alinea closed temporarily for renovations. The restaurant planned to operate pop-up restaurants worldwide before reopening on May 20, 2016 after an extensive remodel and overhaul of the menu.

In May 2016, Alinea and its chef and owner Grant Achatz were featured in the Netflix show Chef's Table.

In 2020, Alinea served diners from a rooftop when all indoor dining was closed in Illinois during the coronavirus pandemic. The menu included a canapé shaped like the SARS‑CoV‑2 virus. Alinea Group co-owner Nick Kokonas stated the appetizer was "meant to provoke discomfort, conversation, and awareness", but some diners described it as "tacky", "disrespectful", and "insensitive".

In March 2025, Alinea marked its 20th anniversary with an immersive, month-long residency at Olmsted in Brooklyn, New York.

== Awards and honors ==
From 2011 to 2024, Alinea was awarded three stars by the Michelin Guide. In November 2025, the restaurant was demoted to two stars in the Michelin Guide.

Alinea received the AAA Five Diamond Award, the highest level of recognition given by the AAA, from 2007 to 2025. It ranked ninth on the S. Pellegrino World's 50 Best Restaurants List, second only to Eleven Madison Park in the US. From 2011–2024, Alinea was one of two Michelin Guide 3-star restaurants in Chicago. Alinea received the 2016 James Beard Foundation Award for Outstanding Restaurant.

In 2016, Alinea was ranked 15th among the World's 50 Best Restaurants, an increase of 11 spots from 2015. In October 2016, TripAdvisor named it the number one fine dining restaurant in the United States, and one of the 10 best restaurants in the world.

In the 2017 list of the World's 50 Best Restaurants, Alinea was ranked 21st in the world. In the 2018 list of the World's 50 Best Restaurants, Alinea was ranked 34th in the world. In the 2019 list, Alinea was ranked 37th in the world.

== See also ==
- List of Michelin 3-star restaurants in the United States
- List of Michelin-starred restaurants in Chicago
- Next (restaurant)
- The Aviary (bar)
