= List of sushi restaurants =

The following is an incomplete list of notable sushi restaurants.

Sushi is a Japanese food composed of specially prepared vinegared rice combined with varied ingredients such as (chiefly) seafood (often uncooked), vegetables, egg, and occasionally tropical fruits. Styles of sushi and its presentation vary widely, but the key ingredient is sushi rice, also referred to as shari or sumeshi. Numerous traditions surround not only the preparation of sushi, but also its service and consumption. Internationally, sushi has become iconic of Japanese cuisine and is popular in many countries.

== Sushi restaurants ==
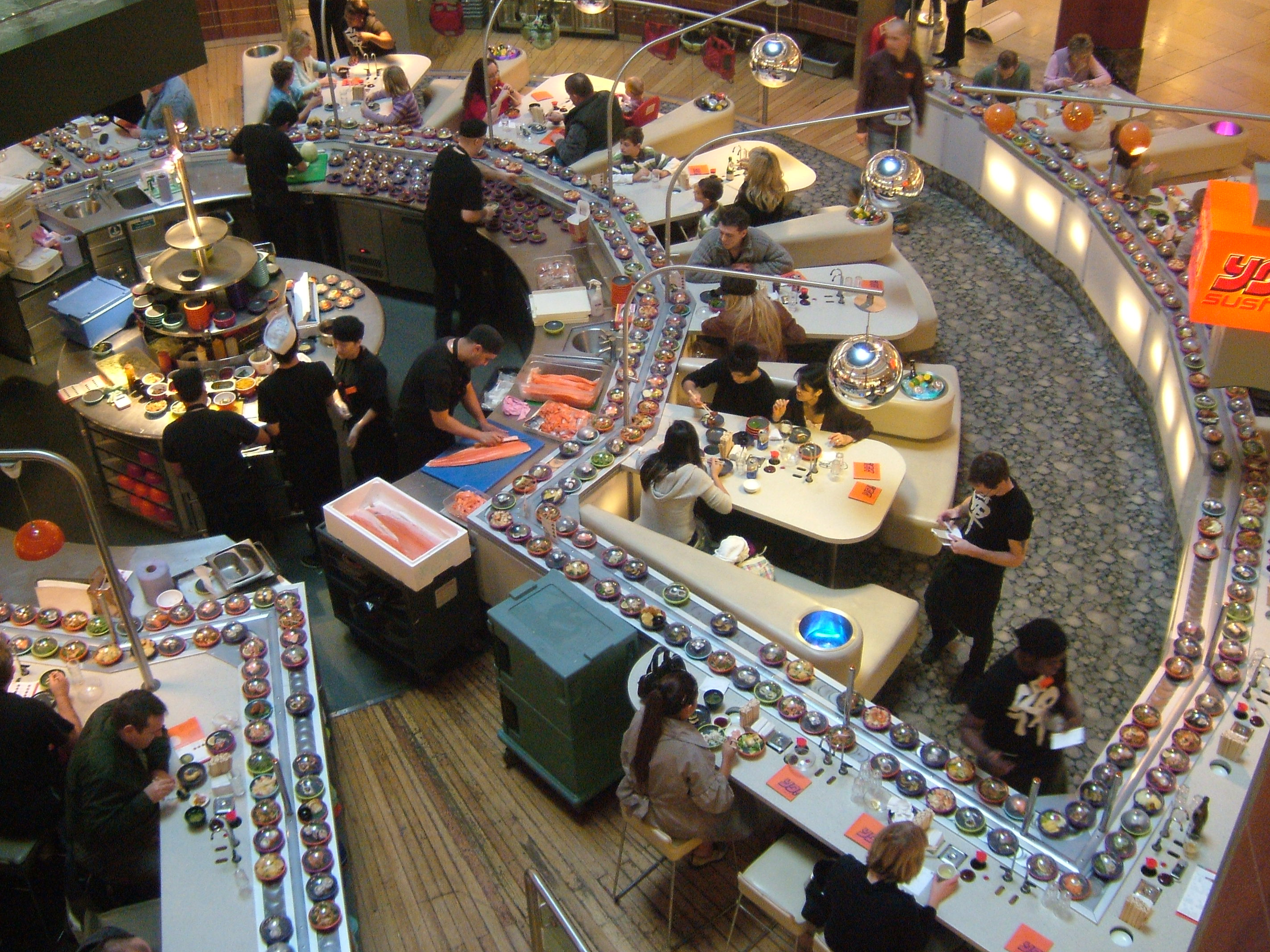
Stone, Kent, England: conveyor belt sushi at a YO! Sushi location in Bluewater Shopping Centre

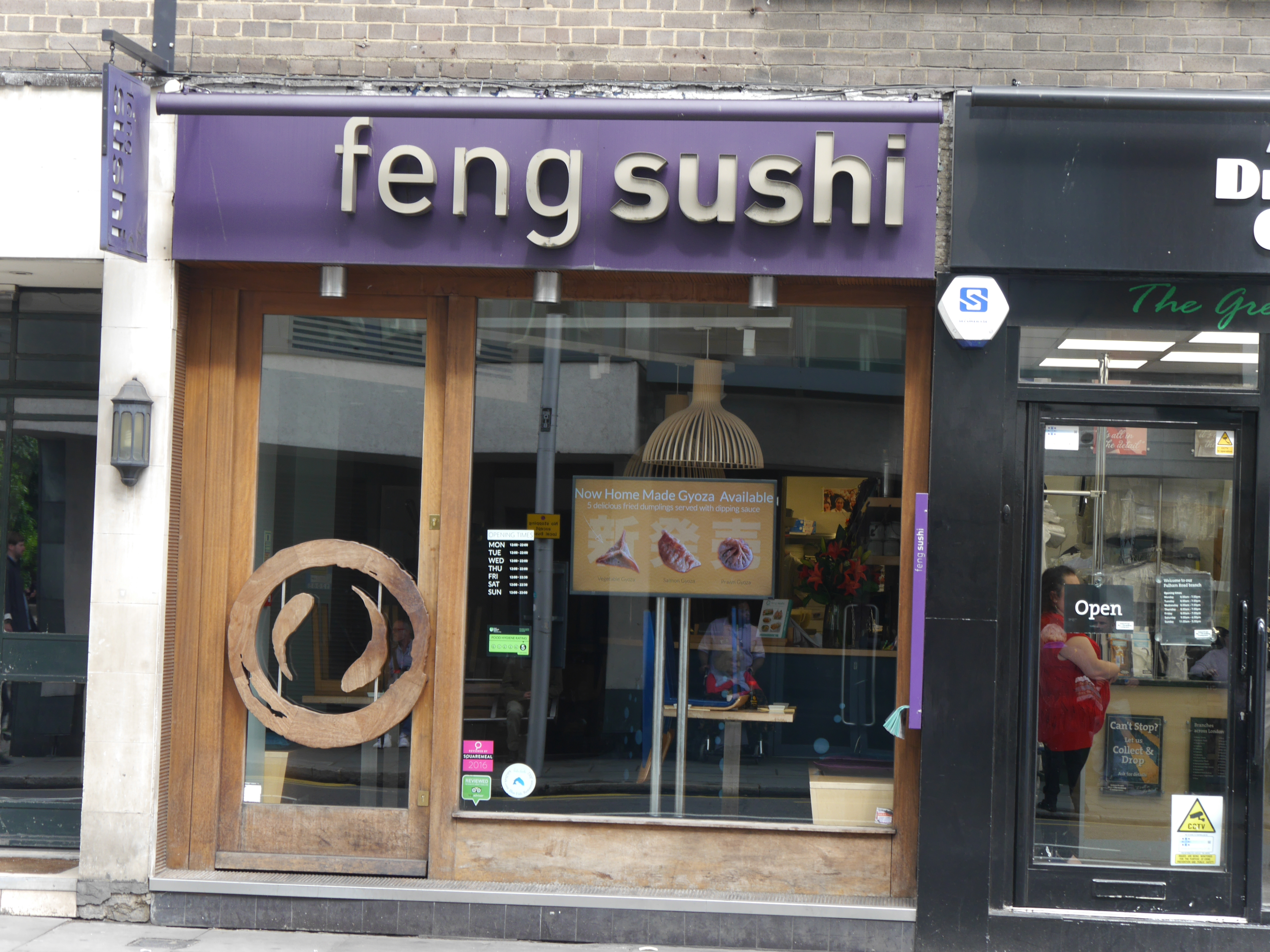
Chelsea, London, England: Feng Sushi

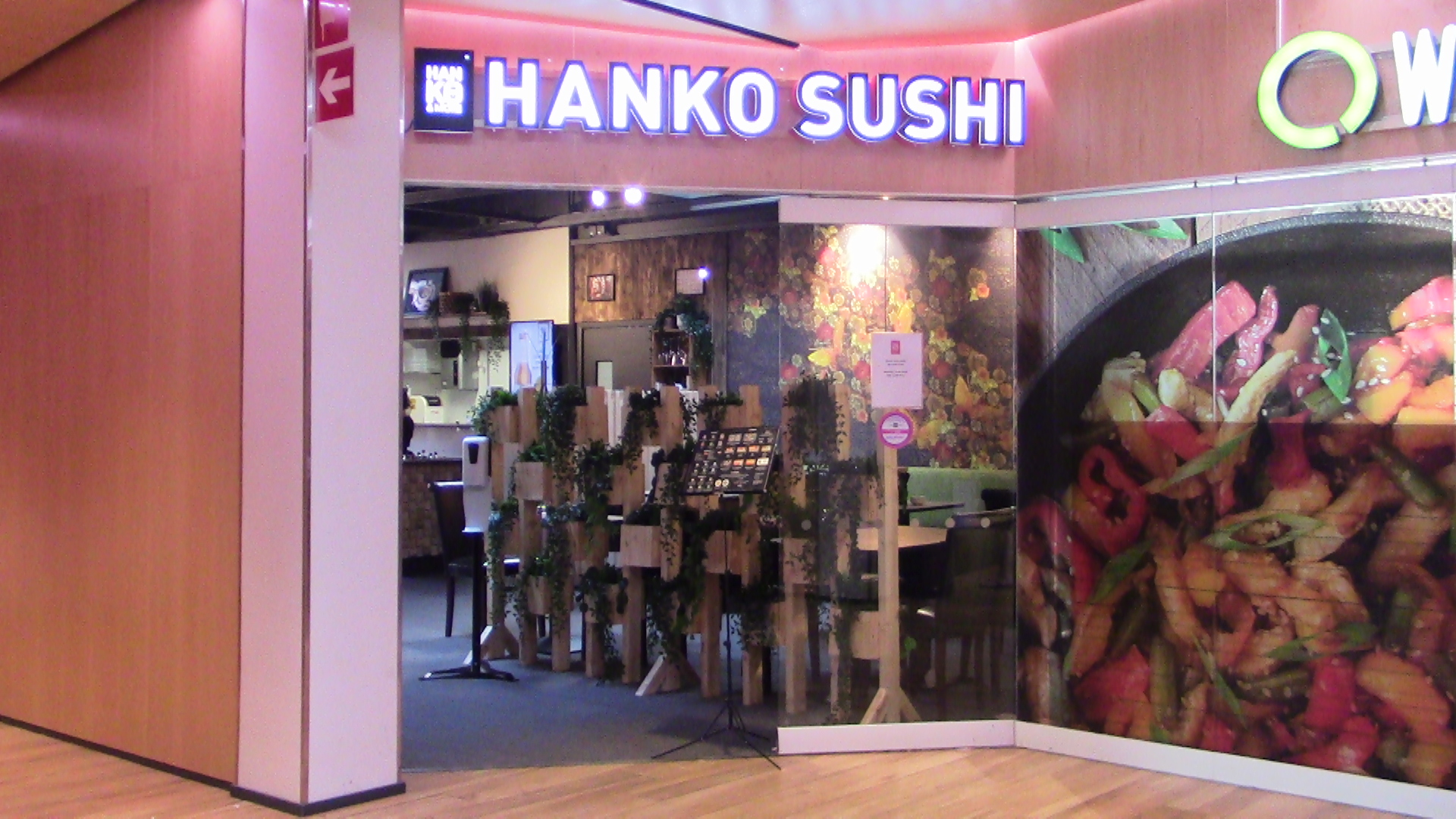
Oulu, Finland: a Hanko Sushi restaurant in the shopping centre Valkea

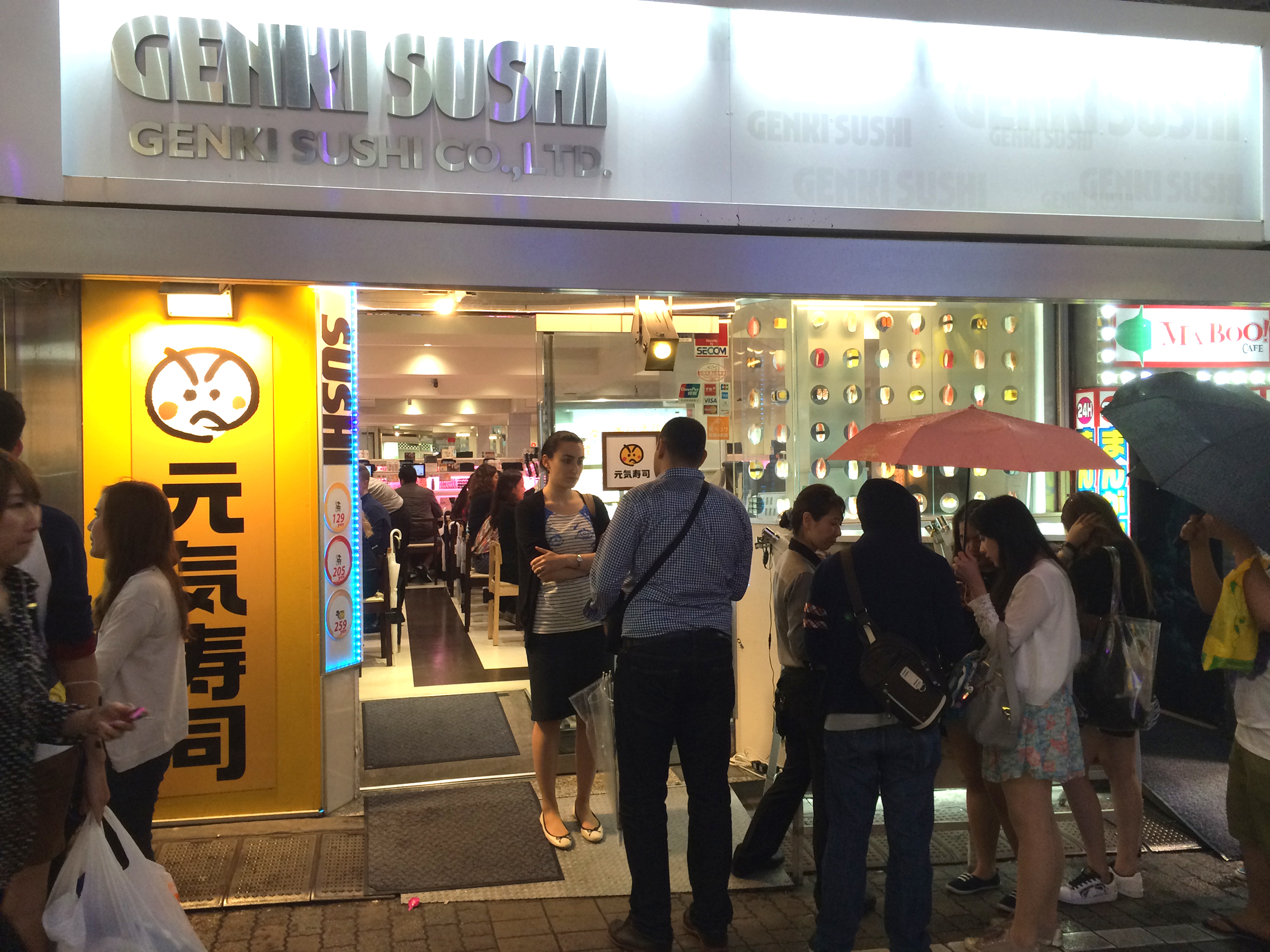
Shibuya, Tokyo, Japan: a Genki Sushi location

=== In Japan ===
- Araki – a sushi restaurant that received a three-star rating in the 2011 edition of the Michelin Guide for Tokyo, Yokohama and Kamakura.
- Esaki – a Michelin 3-star sushi restaurant located in the Hills Aoyama building in Shibuya. It is owned and operated by sushi chef Shintaro Esaki.
- Genki Sushi – a chain of conveyor belt sushi restaurants established in 1990 in Japan.
- Kura – a conveyor belt sushi restaurant chain with 362 locations in Japan, and a few more outside Japan.
- Sukiyabashi Jiro – A Michelin 3-star sushi restaurant in Ginza, Chūō, Tokyo, Japan that is owned and operated by sushi master Jiro Ono.
- Sushi Mizutani – a former sushi restaurant in Ginza, Chūō, Tokyo, Japan that was awarded two Michelin stars.
- Sushi Saito – a three Michelin Star Japanese cuisine restaurant in Minato, Tokyo, primarily known for serving sushi.
- Sushi Yoshitake – a Michelin 3-Star sushi restaurant in Ginza, Chūō, Tokyo, Japan

==== Rest of Asia ====
- Sakae Sushi – a restaurant chain based in Singapore serving Japanese cuisine, and is the flagship brand of Apex-Pal International Ltd. Aimed at the low to mid-level pricing market, it purveys sushi, sashimi, teppanyaki, yakimono, nabemono, tempura, agemono, ramen, udon, soba and donburi served either à la carte or via a sushi conveyor belt.
- Standing Sushi Bar – a Japanese-food restaurant chain in Singapore and Indonesia

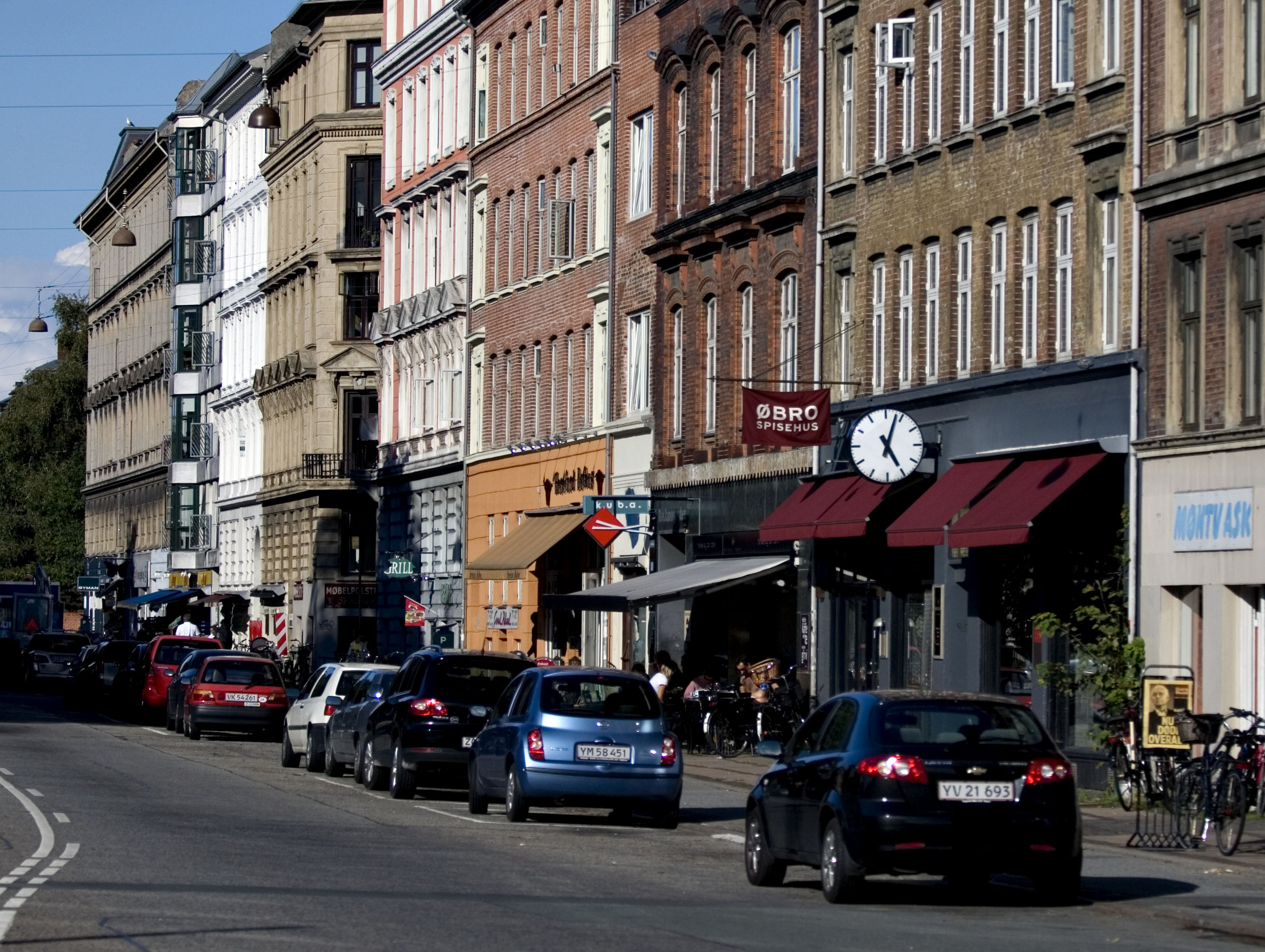
Copenhagen, Denmark: Sticks'n'Sushi on Øster Farimagsgade

- Sushi Express – a Taiwanese chain restaurant group specializing in conveyor belt sushi, operating 665 directly managed outlets across Asia in countries including China, Hong Kong, Singapore, and Thailand.

=== In United Kingdom ===
- The Araki – opened 2014, in London, by Japanese chef Mitsuhiro Araki. It was awarded two stars in the 2016 Michelin Guide for the UK and Ireland, then being awarded three in the 2018 Guide, before making it the first Japanese restaurant ever to lose all three of its stars (in the UK) by 2020.
- Feng Sushi – a UK-based sushi restaurant chain known for advocating sustainable fish farming
- Itsu – a British chain of Asian-inspired fast food shops and restaurants, and a grocery company.
- Wasabi – a fast food restaurant chain based in the United Kingdom focused on Japanese food, especially sushi and bento, it operates in London and New York
- YO! Sushi – a company that owns, operates, and franchises conveyor belt sushi restaurants, principally in the United Kingdom, Ireland, United States, Europe and the Middle East.
- Zuma

==== Rest of Europe ====
- Hanko Sushi - the largest sushi restaurant chain in Finland
- Sticks'n'Sushi – a Copenhagen-based restaurant and take-away chain specialising in sushi and yakitori sticks, it consists of 12 restaurants in the Greater Copenhagen area and 7 restaurants in the UK.

=== In United States ===
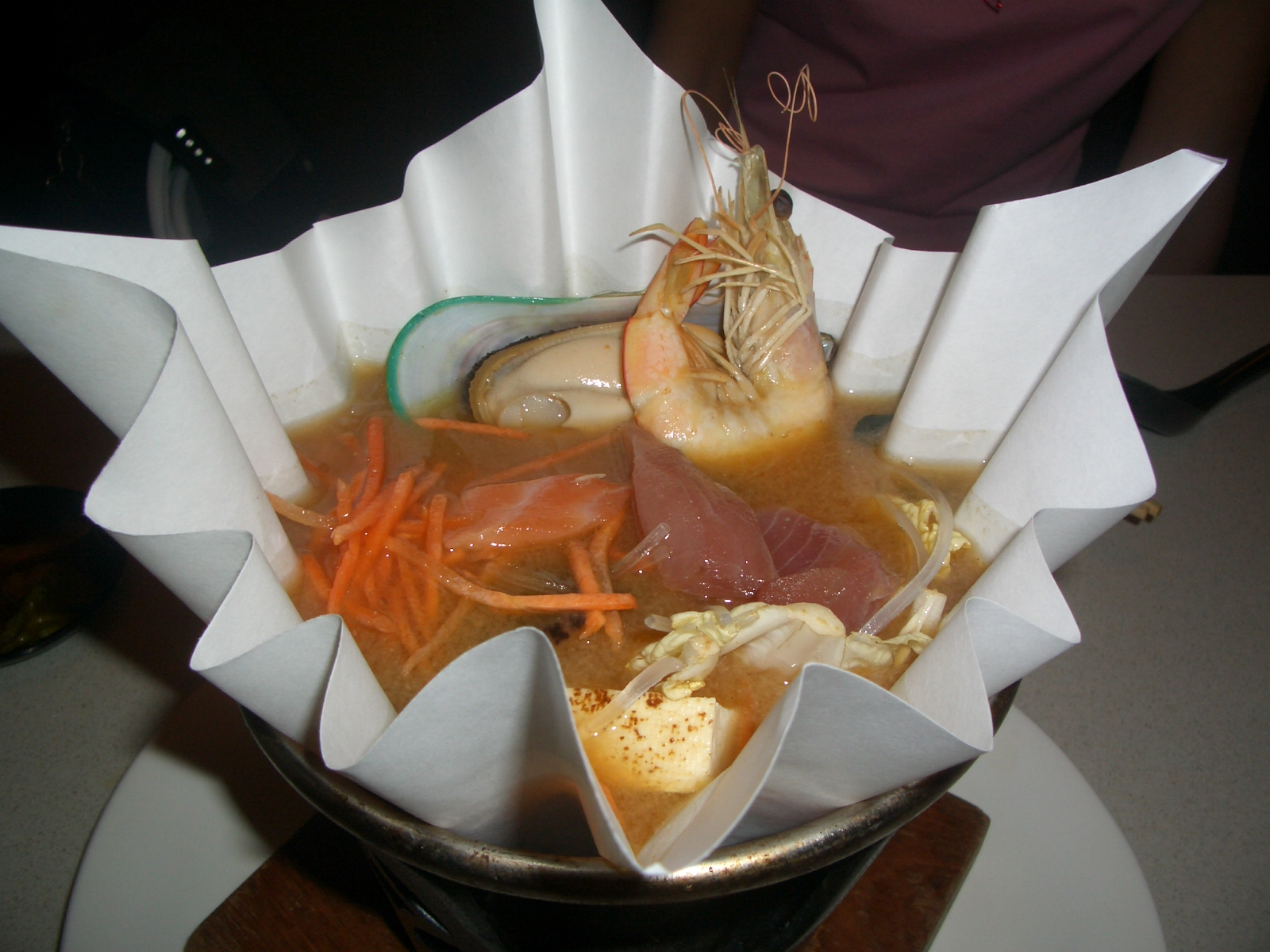
Singapore: "Paper steamboat", a dish at Sakae Sushi

- Asanebo, Los Angeles
- Bamboo Sushi
- Benihana – an American restaurant company based in Aventura, Florida that owns or franchises 116 Japanese cuisine restaurants around the world, including its flagship Benihana Teppanyaki brand, as well as the Haru (fusion cuisine) and RA Sushi restaurants. It was founded by Hiroaki Aoki in New York City.
- Bluefin Tuna and Sushi, Portland, Oregon
- FOB Poke Bar, Seattle metropolitan area
- Hayato, Los Angeles
- Kaede, Portland, Oregon
- Kizaki, Denver, Colorado
- Kusakabe, San Francisco
- Masa – a Michelin-starred Japanese and sushi restaurant located on the fourth floor of the Time Warner Center Masa garnered the Michelin Guide's highest rating starting with the 2009 guide and was the first Japanese restaurant in the U.S. to do so.
- Mio Sushi
- Miura, Beverly Hills, California
- Miya's – located in New Haven, Connecticut, US, it is the first sustainable sushi restaurant in the world.
- Momiji, Seattle
- Morihiro, Los Angeles
- Nozawa Bar, Beverly Hills, California
- Nimblefish, Portland, Oregon
- Q Sushi, Los Angeles
- Saburo's, Portland, Oregon
- Sasabune – a Japanese sushi restaurant located on the Upper East Side of Manhattan, New York City.
- Shin Sushi, Los Angeles
- Sushi Ichiban, Portland, Oregon
- Sushi Ichimura, New York City
- Sushi Kaneyoshi, Los Angeles
- Sushi Kashiba, Seattle
- Sushi Nakazawa – an upscale Japanese sushi restaurant located on Commerce Street in Manhattan, New York City. Daisuke Nakazawa is its head chef.
- Sushi of Gari – a Japanese sushi restaurant located on the Upper East Side of Manhattan, in 2006 and 2009, Michelin Guide gave it a one-star rating.
- Sushi Roku – an upscale American sushi restaurant chain
- Sushi Samba – an American sushi restaurant chain
- Sushi Seki – a Japanese sushi restaurant located on the Upper East Side in Manhattan, New York City
- Sushi Sho
- Sushi Taro, Washington, D.C.
- Sushi Tadokoro, San Diego
- Sushi Yasuda – a Michelin one-star Japanese sushi restaurant located in the Grand Central area of Midtown Manhattan, in New York City
- Tatsu Dallas, Texas
- Uchi – a contemporary Japanese sushi restaurant located in Austin, Texas
- Urasawa – a former Japanese restaurant located in Beverly Hills, California, that as of 2014 was considered the second most expensive in the world after Sublimotion, at $1,111 per person.
- Wako, San Francisco
- Yoko's Japanese Restaurant and Sushi Bar, Portland, Oregon
- Yoshi's Sushi, Portland, Oregon
- Yoshitomo, Omaha, Nebraska

=== In Canada ===
- Okeya Kyujiro, Vancouver
- Sushi Masaki Saito, Toronto
- Sushi Masuda, Vancouver

== See also ==
- List of fish and chip restaurants
- List of Japanese restaurants
- List of oyster bars
- List of seafood restaurants
