= Sushi Seki =

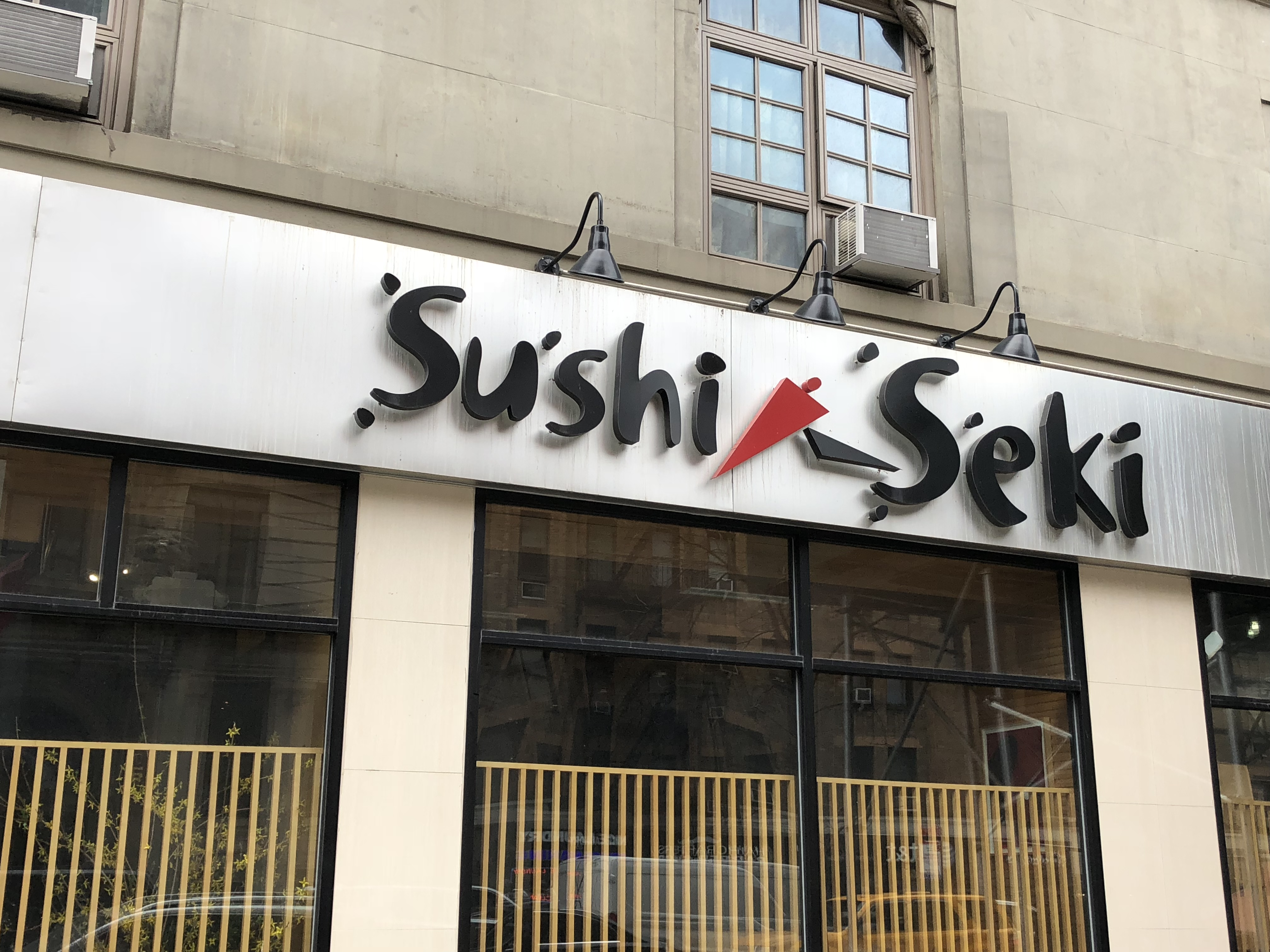
- Sushi Seki Chelsea in 2018
- Interactive map of Sushi Seki

Restaurant information
- Established: 2002
- Owner: Seki
- Chef: Seki
- Food type: Japanese sushi
- Location: 1143 First Avenue (between East 62nd Street and East 63rd Street), on the Upper East Side in Manhattan, New York, New York, 10065, United States
- Coordinates: 40.761955°N 73.960482°W
- Other locations: 208 W. 23rd St. (Chelsea); 365 W. 46th St. (Times Square)
- Website: sushiseki.com

Sushi Seki (formerly, Sushihatsu) is a Japanese sushi restaurant located at 1143 First Avenue (between East 62nd Street and East 63rd Street), on the Upper East Side in Manhattan, New York City. It was established in 2002. Seki, who uses only one name and who spent five years at Sushi of Gari, is the chef and owner.

Chefs such as Jean-Georges Vongerichten from Jean Georges, Eric Ripert of Le Bernadin, Daniel Boulud, and Gordon Ramsay dine at the restaurant.

== Menu ==
Among its offerings are butter fish, tuna tofu, young yellowtail with jalapeño, and pickled toro. It offers omakase. In addition to sushi, with modern sushi being its specialty, the restaurant offers a wide array of sake. The food is served by a knowledgeable staff.

== Reviews ==
In 2013, Zagat's gave it a food rating of 28, which was third-best on the Upper East Side and 10th-best in New York City.

== See also ==
- List of restaurants in New York City
- List of sushi restaurants
