= Miura (restaurant) =

Restaurant in Beverly Hills, California, U.S.

- Interactive map of Miura

Restaurant information
- Established: January 2025
- Owner: Yamato Miura
- Head chef: Derek Wilcox
- Food type: Sushi, omakase
- Rating: (Michelin Guide)
- Location: 218 N Rodeo Dr, Beverly Hills, California, 90210, United States
- Coordinates: 34.0674°N 118.4006°W
- Seating capacity: 8-seat counter
- Website: miura-beverlyhills.com

Miura is a Michelin-starred Japanese restaurant in Beverly Hills, California, United States. It is in the same location as former Michelin-starred restaurant Urasawa.

== See also ==
- List of Michelin-starred restaurants in California
- List of sushi restaurants
