= Kappa Sushi =

Japanese conveyor belt sushi chain

Kappa Create Co., Ltd.
- Native name: カッパ・クリエイト株式会社
- Traded as: TYO: 7421
- Website: www.kappasushi.jp

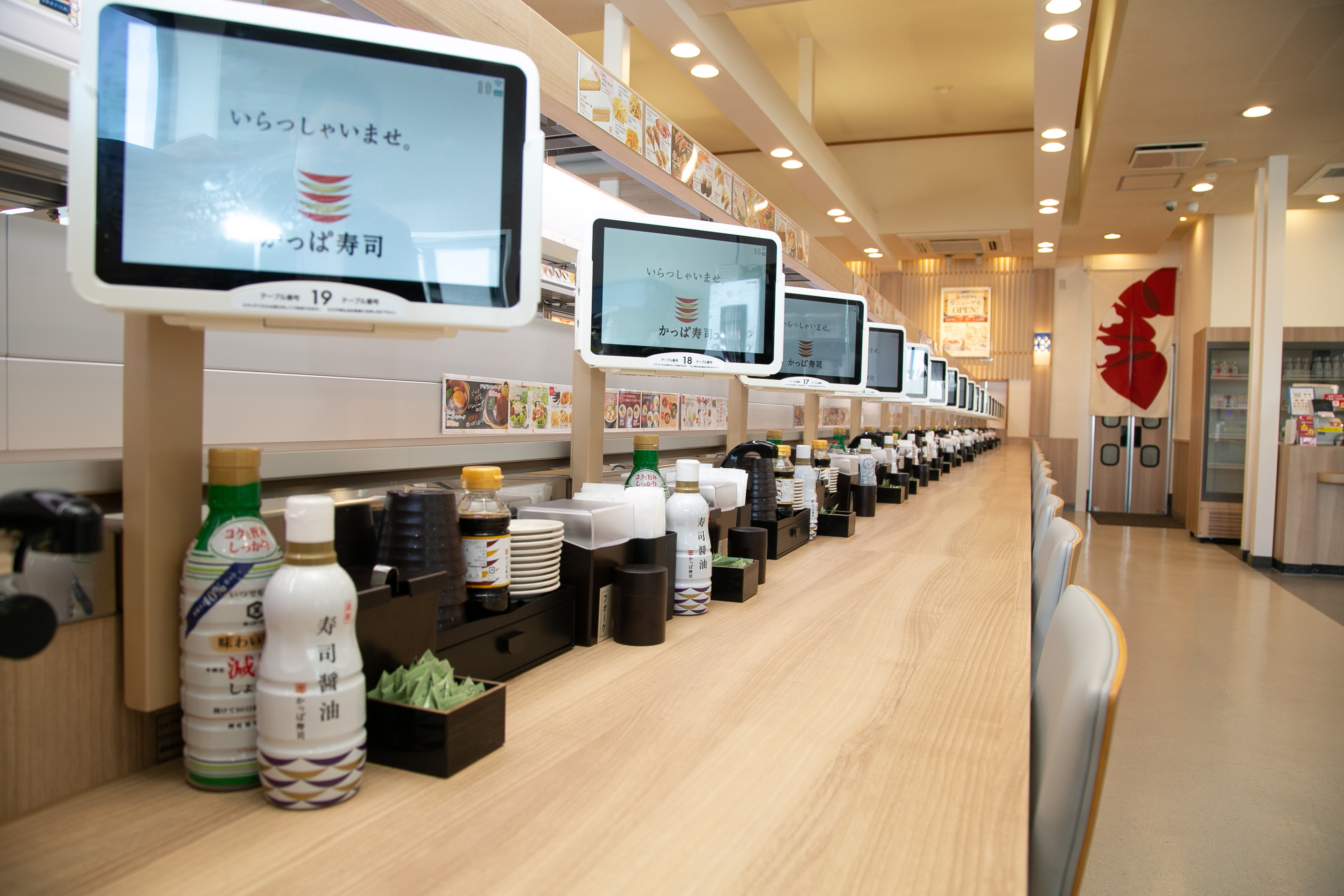
Interior of location in Ichihara, Chiba

Kappa Create Co., Ltd., operating as Kappa Sushi, is the fourth-largest sushi restaurant chain in Japan. The company used to be the market leader in its industry until 2010, but fell behind its competitors Sushiro, Kura Sushi and Hama Sushi afterwards. In 2021, the company was investigated for stealing internal sales data from Hama Sushi. The company reported heavy losses in its 2023 financial year due to increased raw material costs, decreased customers amidst the COVID-19 pandemic in Japan and having to pay higher wages to attract staff.
