= Mr. Green =

Mr. Green may refer to:

- Mr. Green (Clue), is the character in the game of Cluedo/Clue
- Mr. Green Jeans, Hugh Brannum's role on the children's television show Captain Kangaroo
- Mr. Green (record producer), an American Disc jockey and hip hop record producer
- Mr Green (company), an online gambling company
- Mr. Green Tea Ice Cream Company, a food production company based in Brooklyn, New York City
- SoBe Mr. Green, a former brand of carbonated soda drink

== See also ==
- Green (surname)
