= Green Tea (disambiguation) =

Green tea is tea is made from the leaves of Camellia sinensis

Green Tea may also refer to:

- Green Tea (film), a 2003 Chinese film
- Green Tea (radio show), a program on RTÉ Radio 1
- Green Tea and Other Ghost Stories, a 1945 collection of short stories

People with the nickname or stage name Greentea include:

- Greentea Peng (born Aria Wells, c. 1995), British singer
- Tomohiro Tatejima, Japanese Tetris player who competed in the Classic Tetris World Championship

== See also ==
- Mr. Green Tea Ice Cream Company, American ice cream manufacturer
