= Nozawa Bar =

Restaurant in Beverly Hills, California, U.S.

- Interactive map of Nozawa Bar

Restaurant information
- Established: 2013
- Head chef: Jay Sada
- Food type: Japanese, sushi, omakase
- Rating: (Michelin Guide)
- Location: 212 N Canon Drive, Beverly Hills, Los Angeles, California, 90210, United States
- Coordinates: 34.06826°N 118.39829°W
- Seating capacity: 10-seat counter
- Reservations: Required
- Other information: 20-course omakase

Nozawa Bar is a Michelin-starred omakase-style Japanese restaurant in Beverly Hills, California, United States.

In 2013, Nozawa Bar was opened by Kazunori Nozawa, Tom Nozawa, Lele Massimini, and Jerry Greenberg in Beverly Hills behind SUGARFISH restaurant and was referred to as "Secret Sushi." Originally led by Osamu Fujita as executive chef however in June 2025, Chef Fujita stepped down as head chef as he prepares for retirement. Chef Jay Sada was appointed executive chef to replace Fujita.

== See also ==
- List of Japanese restaurants
- List of Michelin-starred restaurants in California
