= Urasawa =

Urasawa may refer to:

- Naoki Urasawa (born 1960), Japanese manga artist and occasional musician
- Urasawa (restaurant), a Michelin Guide 2-star restaurant located in Beverly Hills, California
