= Esaki =

Esaki (江崎) is a Japanese surname. Notable people with the surname include:

- Kazuhito Esaki (born 1986), Japanese football player
- Leo Esaki (born 1925), Japanese physicist
- Takashi Esaki (born 1956), Japanese politician
- Teiso Esaki (1899–1957), Japanese entomologist
- Tetsuma Esaki (born 1943), Japanese politician
- Yoichiro Esaki (born 1958), Japanese politician

== See also ==
- Esaki (restaurant), founded by sushi chef Shintaro Esaki
