= Sushi Roku =

American sushi restaurant chain

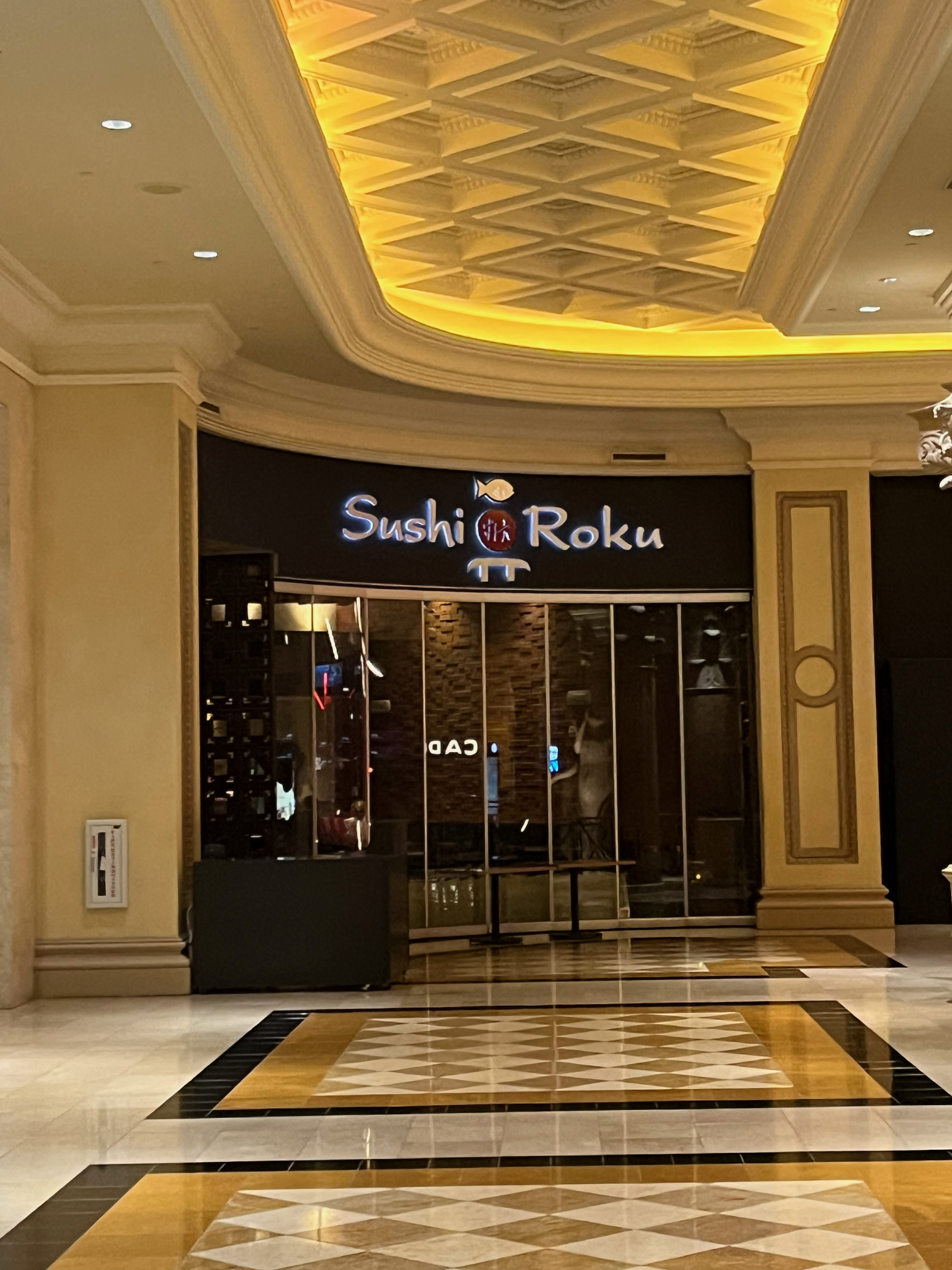
- Exterior of Sushi Roku in Las Vegas in the Forum Shops at Caesars Palace

Restaurant information
- Established: 1997
- Owner: Innovative Dining Group
- Food type: Sushi, Japanese
- Location: United States
- Other locations: Austin, Southern California, and Las Vegas
- Website: sushiroku.com/sushiroku/index.htm

Sushi Roku is an upscale American sushi restaurant chain. Michael Cardenas, former Matsuhisa general manager, teamed with nightclub owners at Santa Monica's Sushi Roku, starting the "sushi lounge" trend.

== History ==
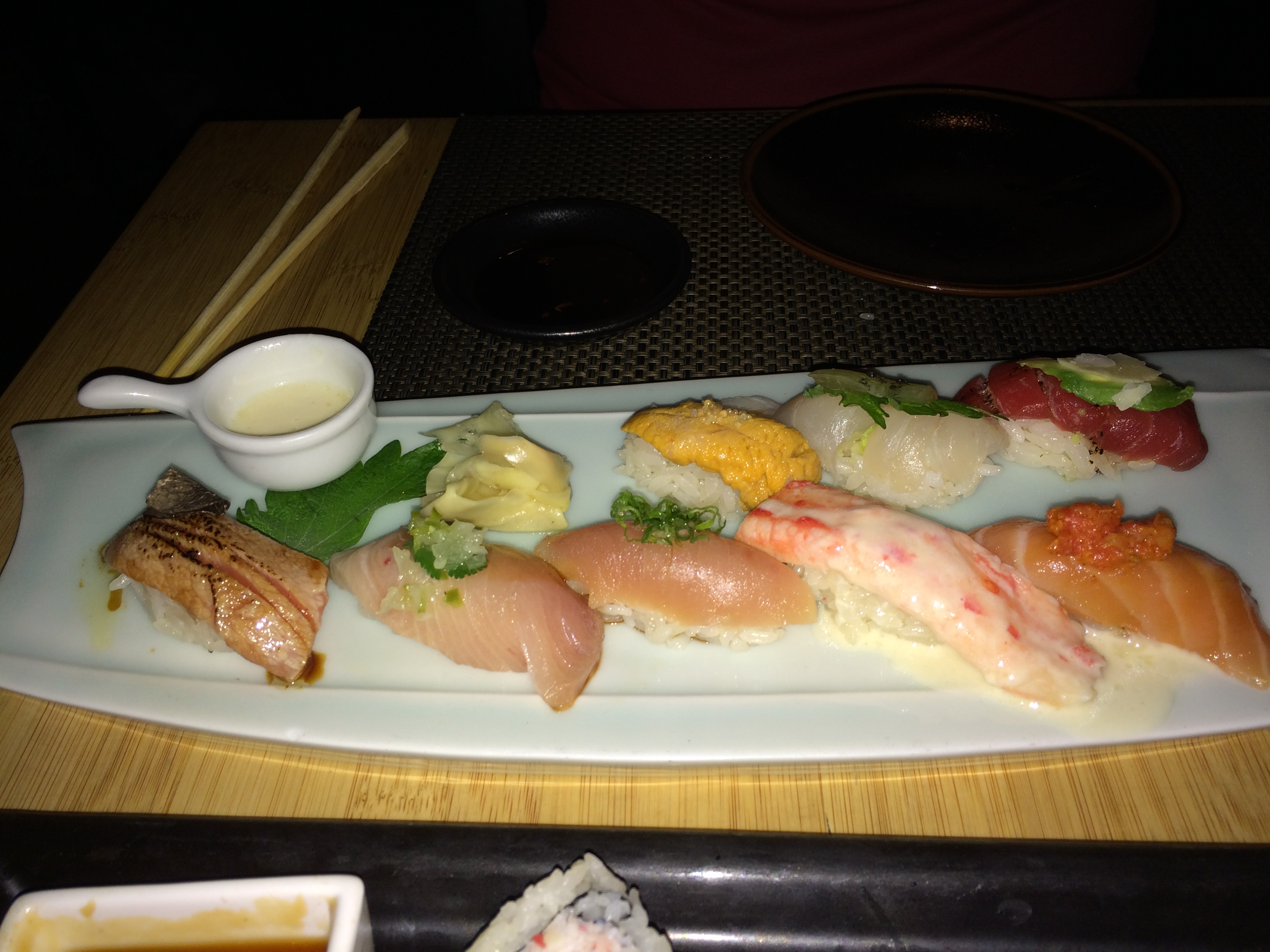
Sushi and sashimi at Sushi Roku in Las Vegas

Sushi Roku opened its first location in Santa Monica, California in 1997 and includes other locations in Pasadena, Newport Beach, and Scottsdale, Arizona. It opened a Las Vegas, Nevada location in 2004. It opened a location in Manhattan Beach in 2022.

Sushi Roku is a subsidiary of Innovative Dining Group (IDG).

== In popular culture ==
Sushi Roku was mentioned in the 2004 Academy Award-nominated film Sideways, by actor Thomas Haden Church's character in a scene at The Hitching Post II.

== See also ==
- List of sushi restaurants
