= Morihiro (restaurant) =

Restaurant in Los Angeles, California, U.S.

- Interactive map of Morihiro

Restaurant information
- Head chef: Morihiro Onodera
- Food type: Japanese
- Location: 1115 Sunset Blvd Ste 100, Los Angeles, California, 90039, United States
- Coordinates: 34°4′57.8″N 118°14′58.1″W
- Website: morionodera.com

Morihiro is a sushi restaurant in Los Angeles, California, United States.

In October 2025, Morihiro moved from Atwater Village to Echo Park.

== See also ==
- List of Japanese restaurants
- List of Michelin-starred restaurants in California
- List of sushi restaurants
