= Standing Sushi Bar =

Restaurant information
- Established: August 2009
- Food type: Japanese cuisine, sushi
- Other information: Fast food restaurant
- Website: www.standingsushibar.com

Standing Sushi Bar is a Japanese-food restaurant chain in Singapore and Indonesia. It was started in August 2009 with its first outlet in Raffles Place. The company was founded by Howard Lo.

Standing Sushi Bar presently has 3 outlets. The restaurant at 8Q SAM opened in September 2010, Marina Bay Link Mall opened in November 2010, and the first branch in Indonesia opened at La Piazza, Jakarta on January 15, 2012. The original Raffles Place branch closed in April 2011.

The restaurant has been cited for its novel use of social media, and it was one of the first in Singapore to offer Foursquare promotions.

== Accolades ==
In March 2010, Standing Sushi Bar was voted #1 sushi in Singapore by the Hungrygowhere community.

== In popular culture ==
In April 2011, Standing Sushi Bar created sushi rolls based on two of the most-talked about candidates (Nicole Seah and Tin Pei Ling) during Singapore's general election.

== See also ==
- List of sushi restaurants
