= Daisuke Nakazawa =

Japanese chef

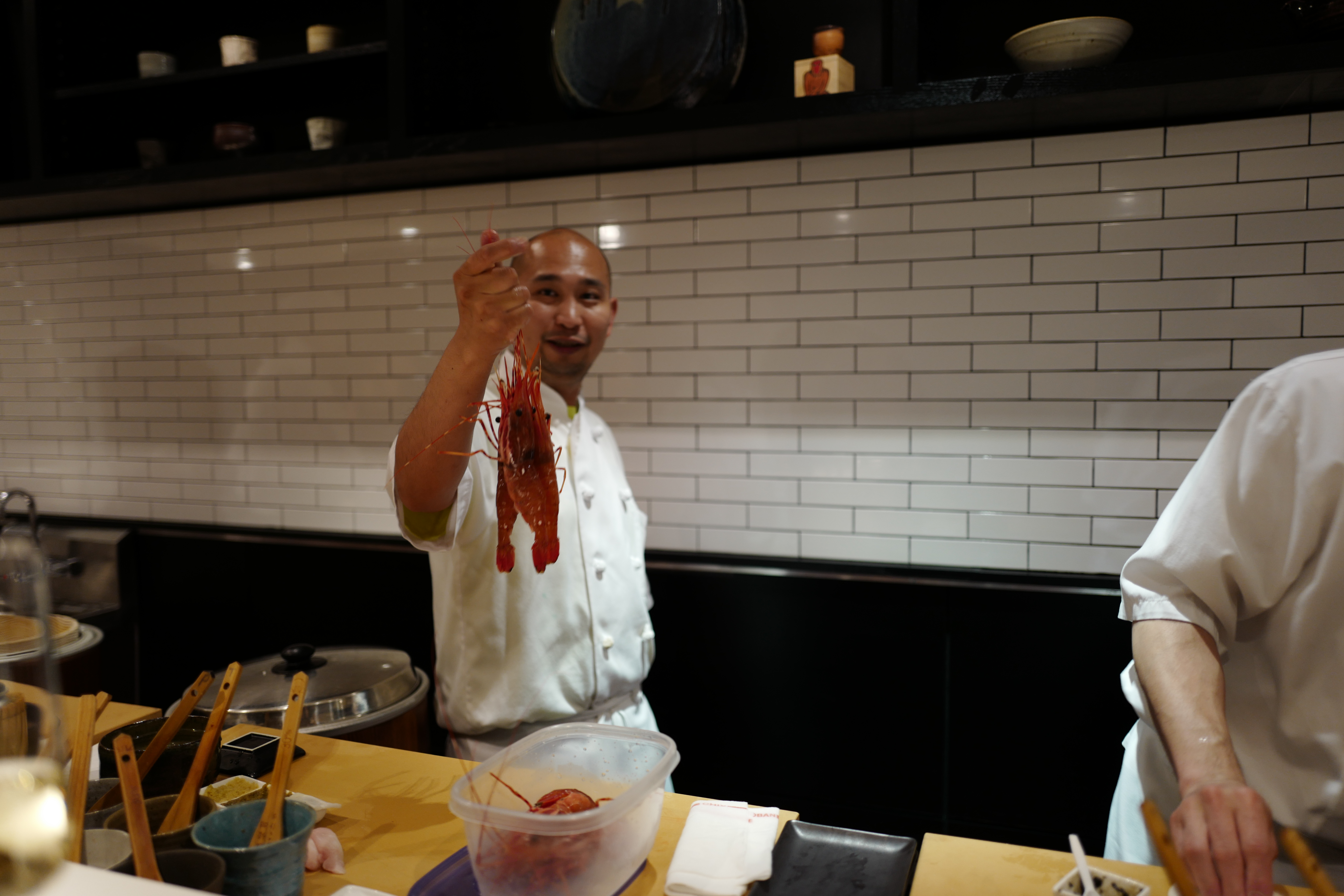
- Nakazawa in 2016
- Born: 1979 (age 46–47); Tochigi, Japan
- Culinary career
- Cooking style: Japanese, sushi
- Current restaurant(s): Sushi Nakazawa, NYC (2013-present)
- Website: www.sushinakazawa.com

Daisuke Nakazawa (born 1979) is head chef of the eponymous Sushi Nakazawa in New York City. Nakazawa apprenticed at Sukiyabashi Jiro under Jiro Ono, and appeared in the David Gelb documentary Jiro Dreams of Sushi. Nakazawa lived and worked in Seattle, at Sushi Kashiba under chef Shiro Kashiba, another Jiro Ono mentored chef, for several years before coming to New York to open Sushi Nakazawa, where he remains.
