= Sushi Nakazawa =

Japanese restaurant in New York City, US

Coordinates: 40.731781°N 74.004489°W

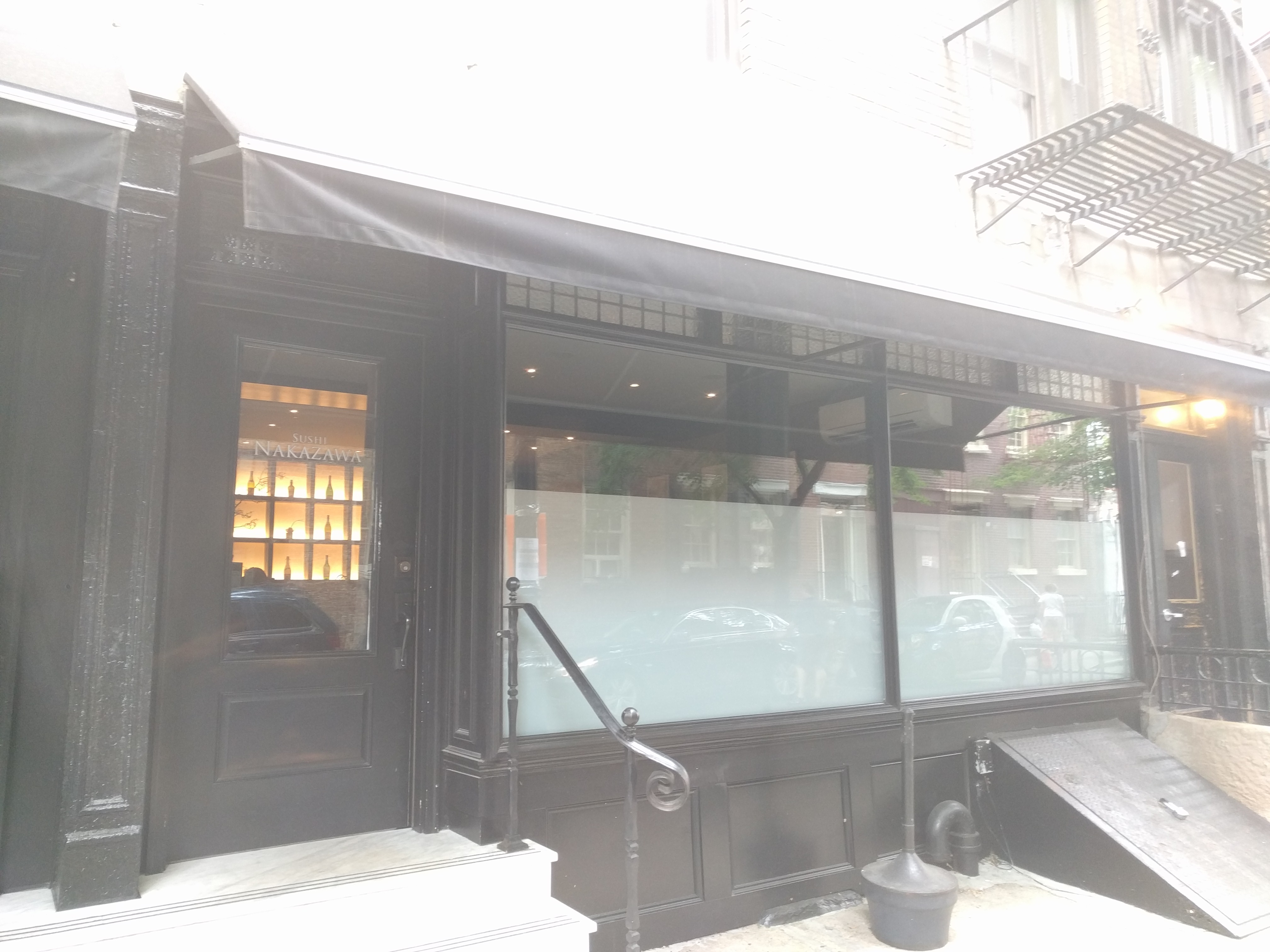
- Interactive map of Sushi Nakazawa

Restaurant information
- Established: 2013
- Owner: Alessandro Borgognone
- Head chef: Daisuke Nakazawa
- Food type: Japanese and sushi
- Rating: New York City (Michelin Guide); Washington D.C. (Michelin Guide)
- Location: 23 Commerce St, New York City, New York, 10014, United States
- Website: www.sushinakazawa.com

Sushi Nakazawa is an upscale Japanese sushi restaurant located on Commerce Street in Manhattan. The restaurant has been praised for its quality and preparation.

== Restaurant ==
The restaurant was opened in 2013 by Maurizio de Rosa and Alessandro Borgognone who hired Jiro Ono's protege Daisuke Nakazawa, after watching David Gelb's documentary, Jiro Dreams of Sushi.

There are only ten seats at the counter and 25 seats in the dining room. In 2016, the restaurant expanded to a space next door, opening a lounge with an a la carte menu.

== Expansion ==
In 2018, Sushi Nakazawa opened a second location in the Old Post Office on Pennsylvania Avenue in Washington, D.C. In May 2026, another location opened in West Hollywood, California.

== Reviews and ratings ==
In December of its opening year, Pete Wells named Sushi Nakazawa among only six restaurants with a perfect four-star review from The New York Times.

The Michelin Guide awarded a star to Sushi Nakazawa in 2019. The DC location was also awarded a star in 2020.

== See also ==
- List of sushi restaurants
- List of Michelin-starred restaurants in New York City
- List of Michelin-starred restaurants in Washington, D.C.
