= Mio Sushi =

Japanese restaurant chain based in Portland, Oregon, U.S.

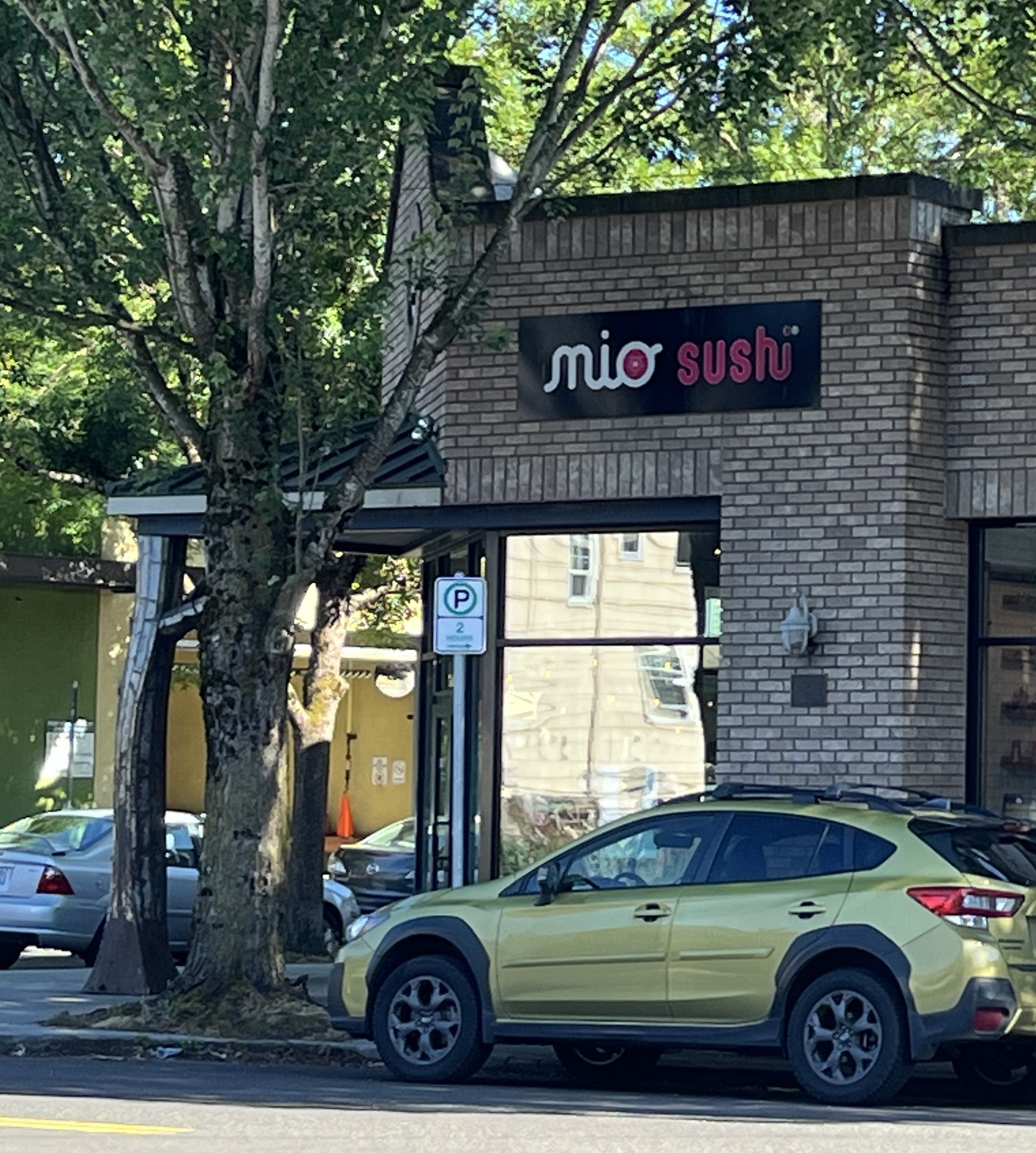
- Exterior of a location in Portland, Oregon, 2025

Restaurant information
- Food type: Japanese
- Location: Oregon; Washington, United States
- Website: miosushi.com

Mio Sushi is a chain of Japanese restaurants based in Portland, Oregon, in the United States. Elsewhere in Oregon, the business has operated in Bend and Eugene, and in Washington, Mio Sushi has operated in Salmon Creek, Seattle, and Tacoma. The business has garnered a positive reception.

== Description ==
The Portland, Oregon-based restaurant chain Mio Sushi serves Japanese cuisine. The restaurants are casual and family-friendly, according to 1859 Oregon's Magazine. In addition to sushi, the menu includes beef yakiniku, chicken wings, a cucumber and asparagus salad with crab and octopus, curry vegetable rice, and miso ramen. The Oregon sushi roll has crab and asparagus, as well as avocado and salmon.

== History and locations ==
There were between eight and twelve locations, as of 2011.

In Portland, Mio has operated in northeast Portland's Hollywood neighborhood. It has also operated a shop on Hawthorne Boulevard in southeast Portland. Elsewhere in Oregon, Mio has operated in Bend and Eugene. The Bend restaurant was at the Cascade Village Mall (or Cascade Village Shopping Center). Like many restaurants, the Bend restaurant operated via delivery and take-out during the COVID-19 pandemic. Mio Sushi was a vendor at the Beaverton Arts Commission's annual Beaverton Last Tuesday series in 2011.

Mio has operated two restaurants in Seattle. The South Lake Union location opened in October 2011, and a Green Lake location opened in 2012. Elsewhere in Washington, the business has operated in Salmon Creek and Tacoma.

== Reception ==
Mio won in the Best Sushi category of Willamette Week's annual readers' poll in 2005 and 2006. The business won in the Best Sushi (Cheap) category in 2007. It was a runner-up in the Best Sushi category again in 2015, 2016, and 2017, and ranked second in the same category in 2022. In 2010, the newspaper's Casey Jarman wrote, "A good ramen bowl is hard to find in Northwest Portland, for whatever reason, and Mio does them up right."

== See also ==
- List of Japanese restaurants
- List of restaurant chains in the United States
- List of sushi restaurants
