= Kaede (restaurant) =

Japanese restaurant in Portland, Oregon, U.S.

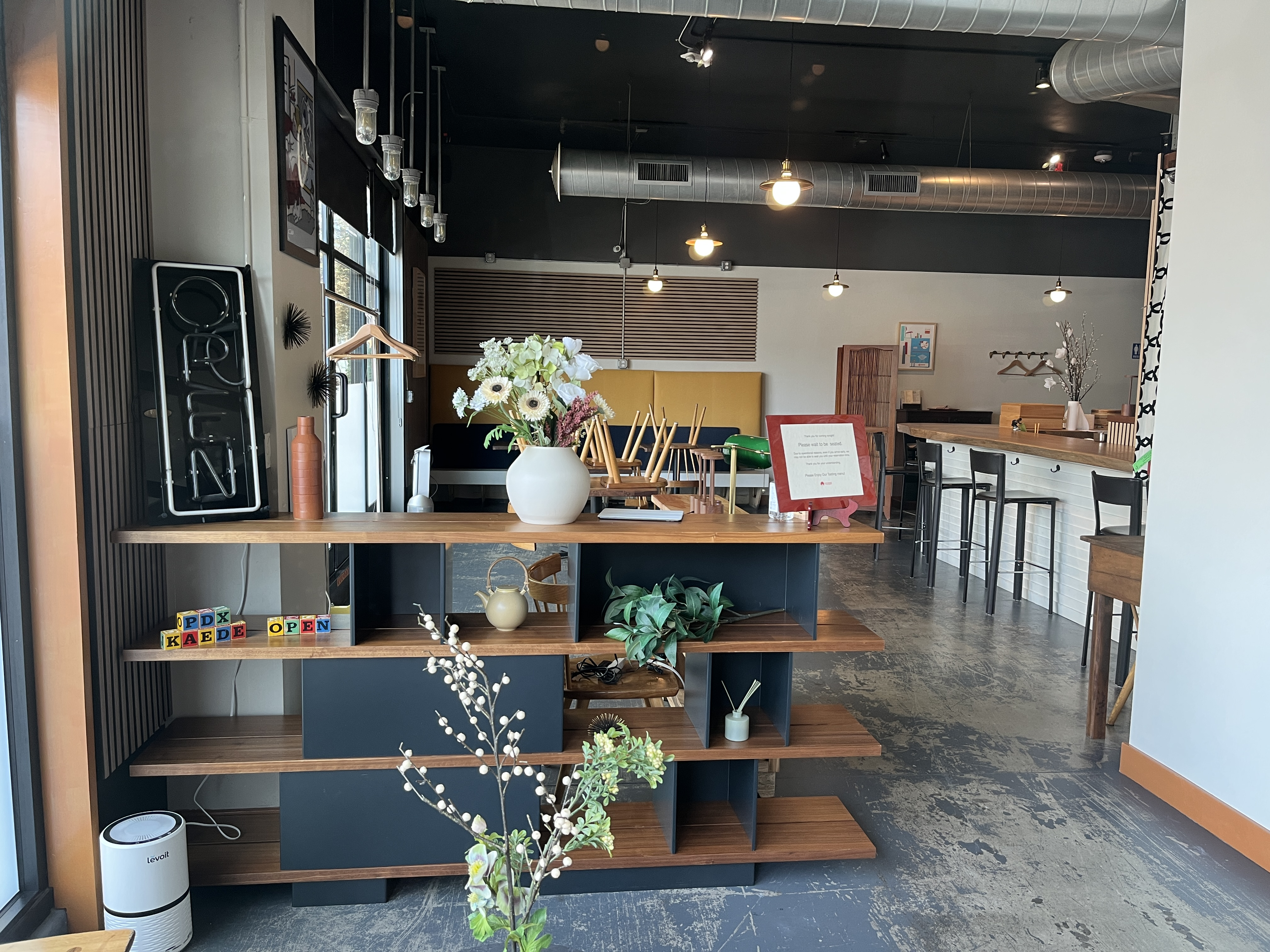
- The restaurant's interior, 2025
- Interactive map of Kaede

Restaurant information
- Established: January 2023
- Owners: Shinji Uehara; Izumi Uehara
- Chef: Shinji Uehara; Izumi Uehara
- Food type: Japanese
- Location: 8268 Southeast 13th Avenue, Portland, Multnomah, Oregon, 97202, United States
- Coordinates: 45.4631°N 122.6527°W
- Seating capacity: 16
- Website: kaedepdx.com

Kaede is a Japanese restaurant in Portland, Oregon, United States. Established in southeast Portland's Sellwood-Moreland neighborhood in January 2023, the restaurant is operated by sushi chef Shinji and Izumi Uehara, who is also a chef and the only server. Kaede specializes in sushi but also served small plates such as agedashi dōfu, chawanmushi, and soba with duck in dashi. The restaurant has garnered a positive reception.

== Description ==
The Japanese restaurant Kaede operates in southeast Portland's Sellwood-Moreland neighborhood. The seating capacity is approximately sixteen people. Katherine Chew Hamilton of Portland Monthly has described Kaede as a "sushi kappo-style" restaurant that "falls somewhere between a casual izakaya and a formal kaiseki", serving sushi and small plates such as agedashi dōfu, chawanmushi, and soba with duck in dashi. The saba battera roll has mackerel, chives, rice, kombu, and wasabi.

== History ==
Kaede opened in January 2023, and is run by sushi chef Shinji and Izumi Uehara, who is also a chef and the restaurant's only server.

== Reception ==
Katherine Chew Hamilton of Portland Monthly named Kaede "our favorite" sushi restaurant in the city. In her June 2023 overview of the city's six "hottest" new restaurants, she wrote, "Since opening in ... January, Kaede has quickly jumped to the higher echelons of sushi in Portland." Hamilton and other writers also included Kaede in the magazine's 2023 list of Portland's twelve best sushi eateries. In December's list of the city's "biggest restaurant moves", Hamilton said Kaede was a "scene stealer" because "It bridges the gap between high-end sushi and neighborhood restaurant". She and other writers also included Kaede in Portland Monthly's 2024 list of the city's 50 best restaurants.

Alex Frane and Janey Wong included Kaede in Eater Portland's 2023 overview of recommended restaurants in Sellwood-Moreland. Wong and Seiji Nanbu included Kaede in a 2024 overview of "knockout" sushi restaurants in the metropolitan area. Krista Garcia of The Infatuation included Kaede in a 2024 list of Portland's 24 best restaurants.

== See also ==
- List of Japanese restaurants
- List of sushi restaurants
