= Kazunori Nozawa =

Japanese sushi chef and restaurant owner

Kazunori Nozawa (born c. 1945) is a Japanese sushi chef and restaurant owner. In 1963, he apprenticed with a master sushi chef in Tokyo at the age of 18, before eventually opening his own restaurant in Japan. After emigrating to the United States as a sushi consultant, he opened Sushi Nozawa in 1987 in Studio City, California, with the goal of educating Americans on Edo-style sushi.

== Sushi Nozawa ==
Sushi Nozawa, who operated until his retirement in 2012, helped popularise omakase-style sushi in Southern California. Nozawa's gruff demeanour and reputation for adhering strictly to omakase principles earned him both fans and critics, with customers nicknaming him the "Sushi Nazi", in reference to Seinfeld's "Soup Nazi" character. His strict list of rules (no mobile phones, text messaging, loud talking or switching seats with patrons) did not dissuade customers, who could expect waits of hours for a seat at table. Sushi Nozawa inspired adoration — musician Trent Reznor lamented the loss of his "very favorite place to eat" upon the restaurant's closing — and vitriol — Los Angeles Times food critic S. Irene Virbila lambasted it as "one of the most overrated restaurants in Southern California", criticizing the "curt and ungracious" service. Nozawa ejected actress Charlize Theron from his restaurant after the two disagreed on what type of sushi would be served for her meal.

== Sushi Nozawa, LLC ==
As of 2013, Kazunori Nozawa serves as President of Sushi Nozawa, LLC, a Los Angeles-based restaurant group.
