= Sushi Kaneyoshi =

Restaurant in Los Angeles, California, U.S.

- Interactive map of Sushi Kaneyoshi

Restaurant information
- Head chef: Yoshiyuki Inoue
- Food type: Japanese
- Rating: (Michelin Guide)
- Location: 111 S San Pedro St, Los Angeles, California, 90012, United States
- Coordinates: 34°3′0.5″N 118°14′29″W
- Seating capacity: 12-seat counter

Sushi Kaneyoshi is a Michelin Guide-starred sushi restaurant in Los Angeles, California.

Yoshiyuki Inoue is the chef. Sushi Kaneyoshi has a "sibling" restaurant called Sawa.

== Reception ==
Kat Hong included the business in The Infatuation's 2021 overview of "The Best Chirashi In LA".

Matthew Kang included the restaurant in Eater Los Angeles' 2022 list of the city's 19 "essential" sushi restaurants and wrote, "Kaneyoshi is one of the newer stars in LA's high-end sushi scene. This counter-only restaurant in Little Tokyo costs a hefty $300 a person and serves a truly spectacular dinner comparable to the best around the world."

Tiffany Tse and Jeff Miller included the business in Thrillist's 2022 list of "The 28 Best Sushi Spots in Los Angeles". Sushi Kaneyoshi topped Time Out Los Angeles' 2022 overview of the city's best sushi restaurants.

== See also ==
- List of Japanese restaurants
- List of Michelin-starred restaurants in California
- List of sushi restaurants
