= Hayato (restaurant) =

Restaurant in Los Angeles, California, U.S.

- Interactive map of Hayato

Restaurant information
- Established: 2018; 8 years ago
- Head chef: Brandon Hayato Go
- Food type: Japanese
- Rating: (Michelin Guide)
- Location: 1320 E 7th St., Los Angeles, Los Angeles, California, 90021, United States
- Coordinates: 34°2′1.6″N 118°14′31″W
- Seating capacity: 7-seat counter
- Reservations: Required
- Other information: $450 14-course omakase tasting menu
- Website: https://hayatorestaurant.com/

Hayato is a Michelin Guide-starred Japanese and seafood/sushi restaurant in Los Angeles, California, United States. Its chef and owner is Brandon Hayato Go. The restaurant is located in the ROW DTLA commercial district and serves traditional Kaiseki style of multi-course dinner.

Hayato offers one seating totaling seven guests per evening, starting at 6:30 pm.

== See also ==
- List of Japanese restaurants
- List of Michelin-starred restaurants in California
- List of seafood restaurants
- List of sushi restaurants
