= Mr. Green Tea Ice Cream Company =

American specialty ice cream producer

Mr Green Tea logo

Mr. Green Tea Ice Cream Company is a third generation family owned business founded in 1968 by Santo (Sam) Emanuele in Brooklyn, New York, that specializes in the manufacture of exotic flavors including green tea, red bean, ginger, chai latte and black sesame.

== Introduction ==
Mr. Green Tea serves tens of thousands of upscale restaurants throughout the country including some of the finest Japanese restaurants in the world, such as Michelin-starred Sushi of Gari and Zagat "Top Ten" Sushi Yasuda.

Martha Stewart served Mr. Green Tea at her 2005 staff holiday party. In 2009, Mr. Green Tea was served at various festival parties and events of the Sundance Film Festival. They have been featured on NJ 101.5 The Jersey Guys Show, and won the Judges' Choice award at the 94.3 The Points Dessert Wars."

Mr. Green Tea's product selection has had a huge influence on the specialty ice cream category and the specialty dessert category as a whole. "Everything was vanilla,'' Santo said. ''And, you know, I knew someone in Philadelphia who was doing some experiments, and we were discussing, and he said, 'Here's a good idea.' The Japanese restaurants were growing like mushrooms and why not try them?'' That was in the 1970's." It wasn't until many years later that specialty ice cream began to go mainstream with the help of the popularity of Ben & Jerry's.

== History ==
Mr. Green Tea is named after their trademark ice cream flavor, green tea, which Santo created over forty years ago. "He worked on a recipe for green tea ice cream and peddled it to Japanese restaurant owners, who then coached him on how to refine it."

"With experience in the grocery and dairy industry, Santo sought out to develop new flavors of ice cream to appeal to the burgeoning NYC Japanese restaurant trade. Green Tea, Red Bean & Ginger were developed. Now in its third generation, Mr. Green Tea still handcrafts its exotic desserts using all natural ingredients."

With the strategic investment made by Marcus Lemonis in 2013, Mr. Green Tea has opened a state of the art food production facility in New Jersey that has allowed them to branch off into other areas within the food production industry, such as co-packing, contract manufacturing, private labeling and brand acquisition.

== Television ==
On May 14, 2013, Mr. Green Tea was featured on the CNBC show Crowd Rules.

Businessman and star of CNBC's new primetime hit The Profit, Marcus Lemonis, saw the Mr. Green Tea family on Crowd Rules and requested them to be cast for The Profit. "I was getting intimately involved with the casting, because I'm not gonna put my own money into something I don't like. And I watched the Crowd Rules episode. We were literally in the middle of production; we had all the companies chosen; and I watched the episode and fell in love with the family dynamic -- and I love ice cream, I'm a big candy guy. And I called the network and said, 'Look, these people' -- they should have won, first of all, in that episode, but that's neither here nor there, and they hit the jackpot anyway -- and I called the network and said 'Look, I want an audible here, I love these people. Would you consider allowing them to be one of the companies that I take a look at.' "

The ensuing relationship led to a partnership with Mr. Lemonis and ultimately to being featured on the season one finale of The Profit.

Marcus Lemonis made some changes and helped expand the company. “Since Lemonis brought manufacturing in-house, margins have increased, sales volume is up 50 percent, and the valuation has jumped from $12.5 million to $117.5 million. Lemonis is integrating it with his other sweet investments.”
