= FOB Poke Bar =

Restaurant chain in Washington, US

Restaurant information
- Food type: Japanese
- Location: Seattle; Bellevue, Washington, United States
- Website: fobpokebar.com

FOB Poke Bar is a small chain of sushi restaurants based in the Seattle metropolitan area, in the U.S. state of Washington. The business operates restaurants by this name as well as Fob Poke and Sushi Bar and FOB Sushi Bar in Seattle's Belltown neighborhood and in Bellevue. The restaurants serve sushi by the pound.

The Belltown and Bellevue locations closed voluntarily for two weeks in November and December 2024 to address concerns about food-safety handling. A TikTok video review was posted by social media personality Keith Lee drew comments that claimed to see a live worm in a piece of raw hamachi; FOB said that the movement was caused by the handling of Lee's chopsticks. The chain closed both of its locations prior to an inspection by Public Health – Seattle & King County, which was later conducted prior to the reopening on December 3.

== See also ==
- List of restaurant chains in the United States
- List of sushi restaurants
