= Yoshitomo (restaurant) =

Japanese restaurant in Omaha, Nebraska, U.S.

- Interactive map of Yoshitomo

Restaurant information
- Food type: Japanese
- Location: 6011 Maple Street, Omaha, Douglas, Nebraska, 68104, United States
- Coordinates: 41°17′06″N 96°00′19″W
- Website: yoshitomo.com

Yoshitomo is a Japanese restaurant in Omaha, Nebraska, United States. The restaurant serves sushi, and was a semifinalist in the Outstanding Restaurant category of the James Beard Foundation Awards in 2024.

== See also ==
- List of Japanese restaurants
- List of sushi restaurants
