= Sushi Yasuda =

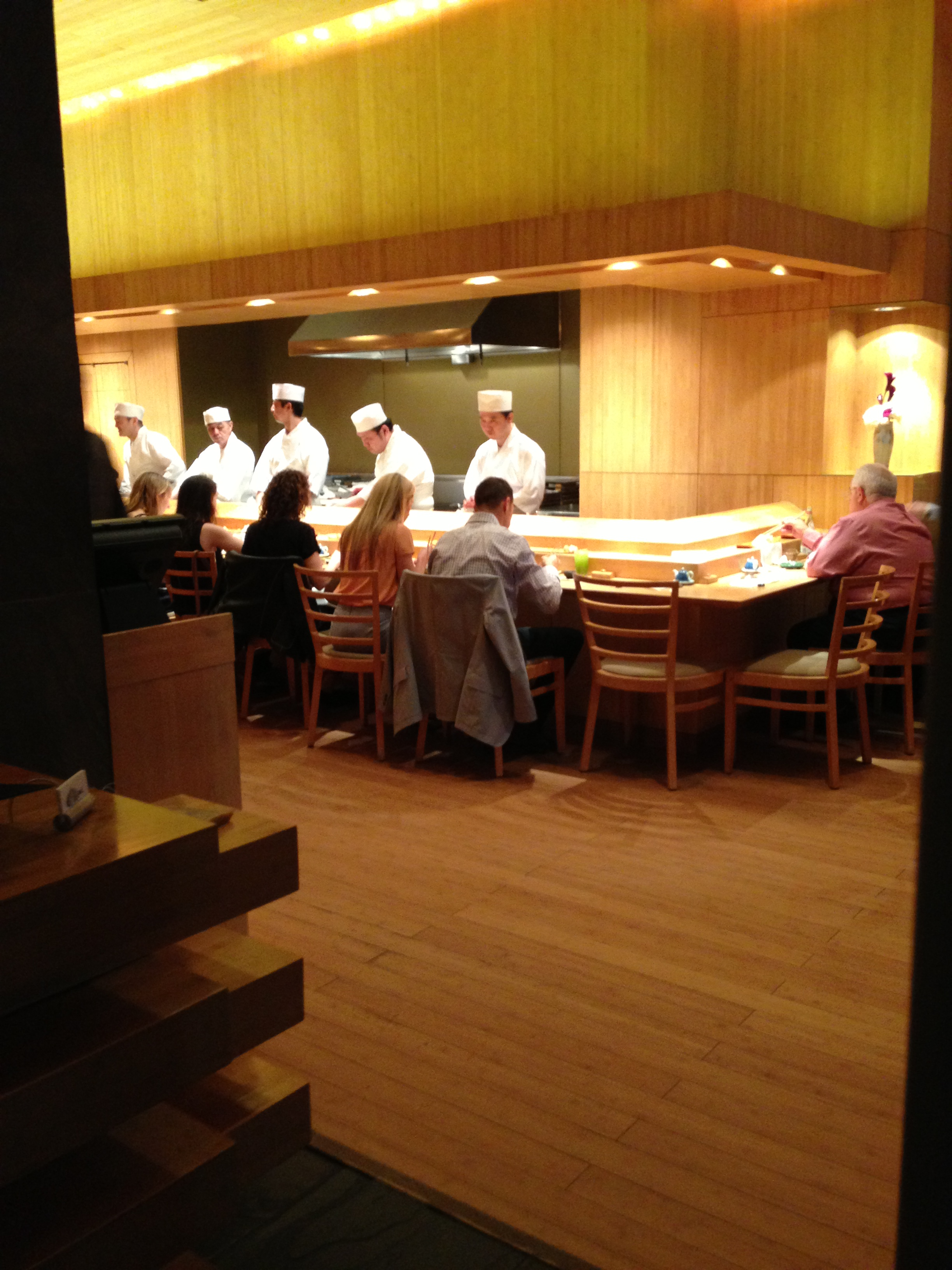
- Sushi Yasuda interior, March 2013
- Interactive map of Sushi Yasuda

Restaurant information
- Established: 1999
- Owners: Shige Akimoto and Scott Rosenberg
- Chef: Mitsuru Tamura
- Food type: Japanese sushi
- Location: 204 East 43rd Street (between Second Avenue and Third Avenue, in Midtown Manhattan, New York, New York, 10017, United States
- Coordinates: 40.751242°N 73.973649°W
- Website: www.sushiyasuda.com

Sushi Yasuda is a Japanese sushi restaurant located at 204 East 43rd Street (between Second Avenue and Third Avenue) in the Midtown East area of Manhattan, New York City.

The restaurant was founded in 1999 by its former chef, Naomichi Yasuda of Chiba Prefecture, who returned to Japan in January 2011 to open a new restaurant in Tokyo, Sushi Bar Yasuda. It is owned by Shige Akimoto, and Scott Rosenberg. The current chef is Mitsuru Tamura.

== Menu ==
Sushi Yasuda usually has five or more variants of tuna available. Food is served omakase style.

== Decor ==
The stark, minimalist restaurant is lined in simple blond-wood, with high ceilings. Sushi Yasuda uses bamboo on its floor, walls, and ceiling.

== Reviews ==
In 2000, restaurant critic William Grimes of The New York Times gave Sushi Yasuda three stars, and in 2001 he called it "sublime." In 2011, Eric Asimov of The New York Times gave it three stars, and Bloomberg gave it two and a half stars.

In No Reservations: Around the World on an Empty Stomach, published in 2007, Anthony Bourdain wrote that it had the "best 'traditional' sushi in New York", adding that "you'll never be able to eat 'utility sushi' again."

In 2013, Zagat's gave it a food rating of 28, the second-highest in the East 40s, and rated it the 9th-best restaurant in New York City.

== See also ==
- List of Japanese restaurants
- List of restaurants in New York City
- List of sushi restaurants
