= Sasabune =

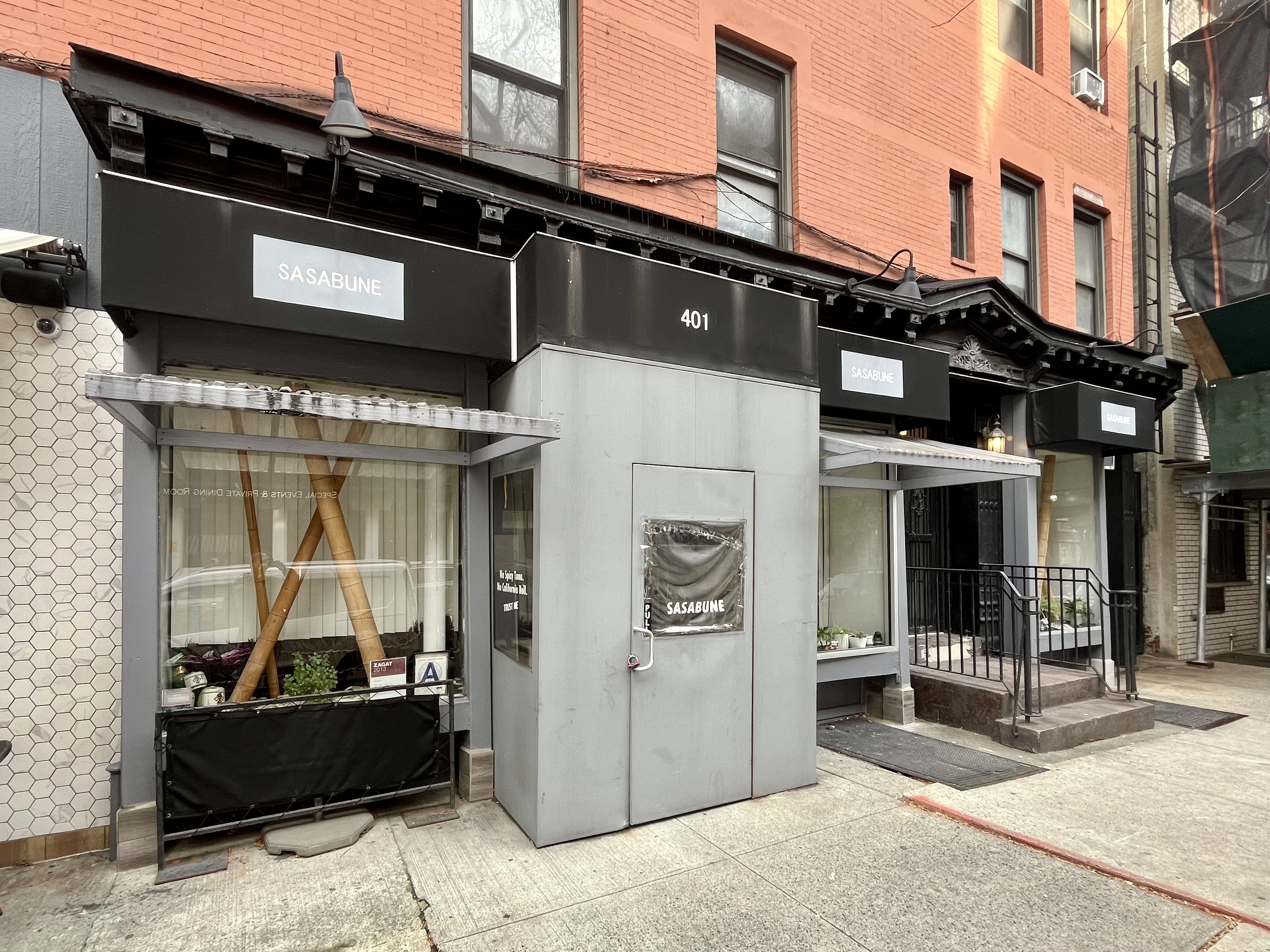
- Sasabune in December 2023
- Interactive map of Sasabune

Restaurant information
- Established: 2006
- Owner: Kenji Takahashi
- Chef: Kenji Takahashi
- Food type: Japanese sushi
- Location: 401 East 73rd Street (between First Avenue and York Avenue), on the Upper East Side in Manhattan, New York, New York, 10021, United States
- Coordinates: 40.76839°N 73.955118°W
- Website: sasabunenyc.com

Sasabune is a Japanese sushi restaurant located at 401 East 73rd Street (between First Avenue and York Avenue) on the Upper East Side of Manhattan, in New York City.

The décor of the tiny, simple, Spartan, bright restaurant consists of white walls that, as The New York Times put it, have "an almost severe lack of adornment". The restaurant has six seats at the blond sushi bar, 14 seats at nearby tables, and 12 in a back room. The sound level is quiet to moderate.

== Menu ==
Sasabune serves only an omakase menu – its chef and owner, Kenji Takahashi, decides what each patron will eat, the order in which the patron will eat it, and whether soy sauce should be applied. It has a sign that states its philosophy: "Today's Special – Trust Me". The wasabi is known to be spicy.

The restaurant, opened in 2006, is named after a restaurant by the same name in Los Angeles.

== Reviews ==
The New York Times wrote in 2006, in a review in which it gave Sasabune one star:

The kanpachi ... was as silky and buttery as the kanpachi I've had anywhere else; the toro was the fatty stuff of head rushes. Mr. Takahashi obviously takes pains to find top-tier ingredients, and he takes pains to mold nicely proportioned beds of rice, the warm temperature of which is what often distinguishes a serious sushi restaurant from an assembly line.

In 2013, it was rated "New York City's best for sushi" and the best restaurant in the East 70s by Zagat's, with a food rating of 29 (the highest food rating on the Upper East Side).
