= Sticks'n'Sushi =

Copenhagen-based restaurant and take-away chain

- Company type: Private
- Industry: Restaurant
- Genre: Japanese restaurant
- Founded: 1994
- Founder: Kim Rahbek Hansen, Jens Rahbek Hansen and Thor Andersen
- Headquarters: Copenhagen, Denmark
- Area served: Copenhagen, London and Berlin
- Key people: Andreas Karlsson (CEO)
- Website: http://sticksnsushi.com

Sticks'n'Sushi is a Copenhagen-based restaurant and take-away group specialising in sushi and yakitori. It consists of 12 restaurants in the Greater Copenhagen area, 14 restaurants in the UK and three in Berlin.

== History ==
Created by the Danish-Japanese brothers Jens and Kim Rahbek Hansen alongside their mother Keiko and their brother-in-law Thor Andersen, the first Sticks'n'Sushi opened on Nansensgade (No. 59) on 22 March 1994. It has been followed by more restaurants in the Greater Copenhagen area.

== UK Restaurants ==
The first Sticks'n'Sushi in London opened on Wimbledon Hill Road in March 2012. In May 2013, the owners raised capital for further expansion abroad through the sale of a 49% share of their company to Maj Invest Equity . The second Sticks'n'Sushi in London opened on Henrietta Street in Covent Garden in October 2013. In 2015, a Sticks'n'Sushi opened in a listed building on the corner of Nelson Road and King William Walk in the heart of Greenwich, close to Maritime Museum, Cutty Sark and Greenwich Park The next opening was at the new Crossrail station in Canary Wharf, here Sticks"n'Sushi served a Japanese Danish fusion breakfast for the 1st time. On 7 May 2016 Sticks’n’Sushi Cambridge opened its doors. On 24 November 2017 Sticks’n’Sushi opened in Westgate Oxford. The seventh UK restaurant opened in Victoria on 8 Dec 2017. In October 2018 they opened their largest UK restaurant to date in Chelsea on the Kings Road, this was also the first restaurant to have a private dining room for the UK. In autumn 2020 the group expanded towards Soho, taking residency in a building that used to house a Police station on Beak Street. Since then, restaurants in White City, Shoreditch, Kingston, Richmond, Islington have followed with more already planned for 2025. The Manchester restaurant (in Spinningfields) opened in 2026. The Birmingham restaurant is planned to open in summer 2026 in Paradise in the city centre.

== Other restaurants ==
In 2017 the company became even more international by opening in Germany. The restaurant was opened in Berlin on Potsdamer Straße. As of October 2023 there are three restaurants in the German capital.

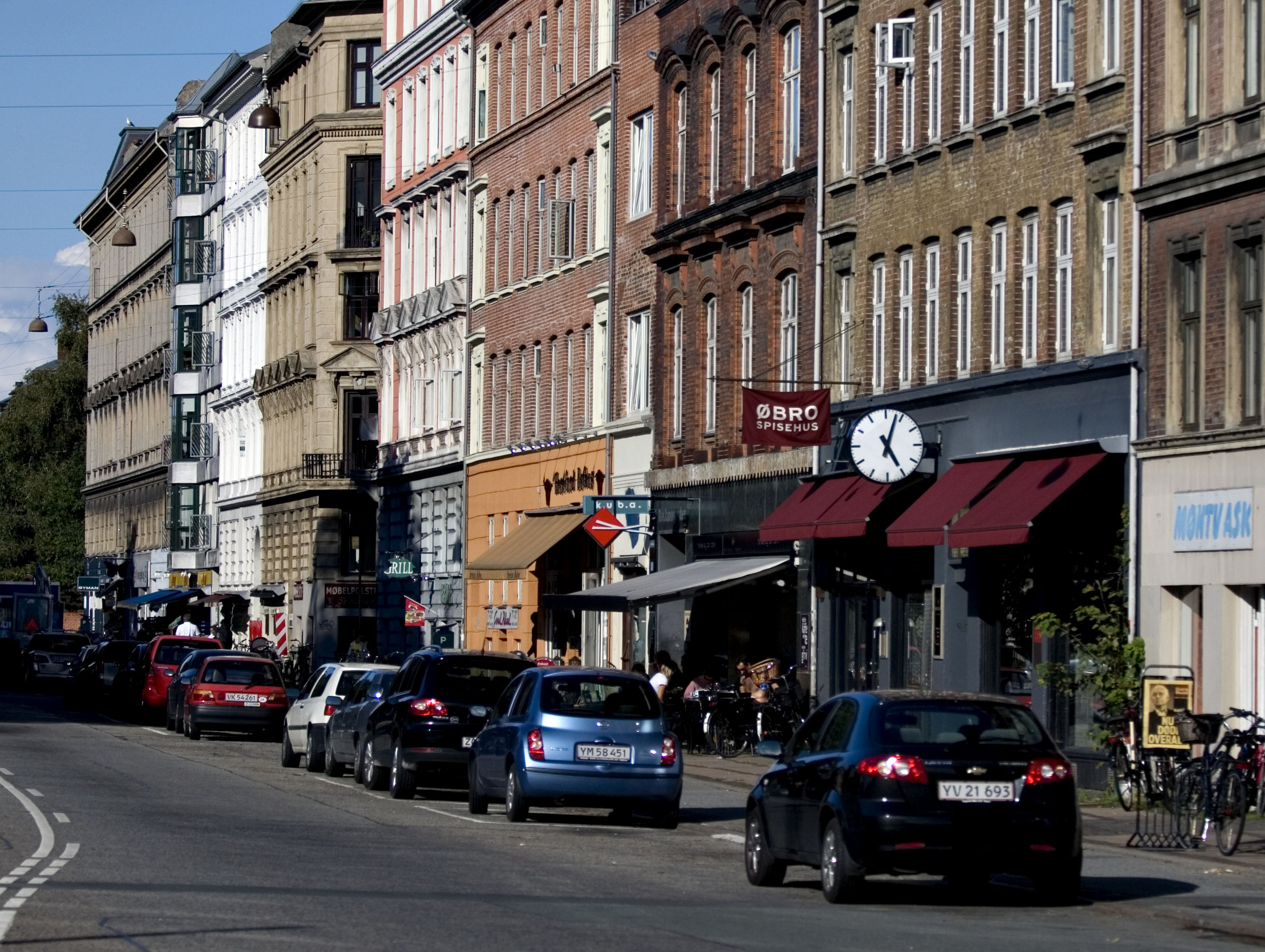
Sticks'n'Sushi on Øster Farimagsgade in Copenhagen

== See also ==
- List of sushi restaurants
