= Momiji (restaurant) =

Japanese restaurant in Seattle, Washington, U.S.

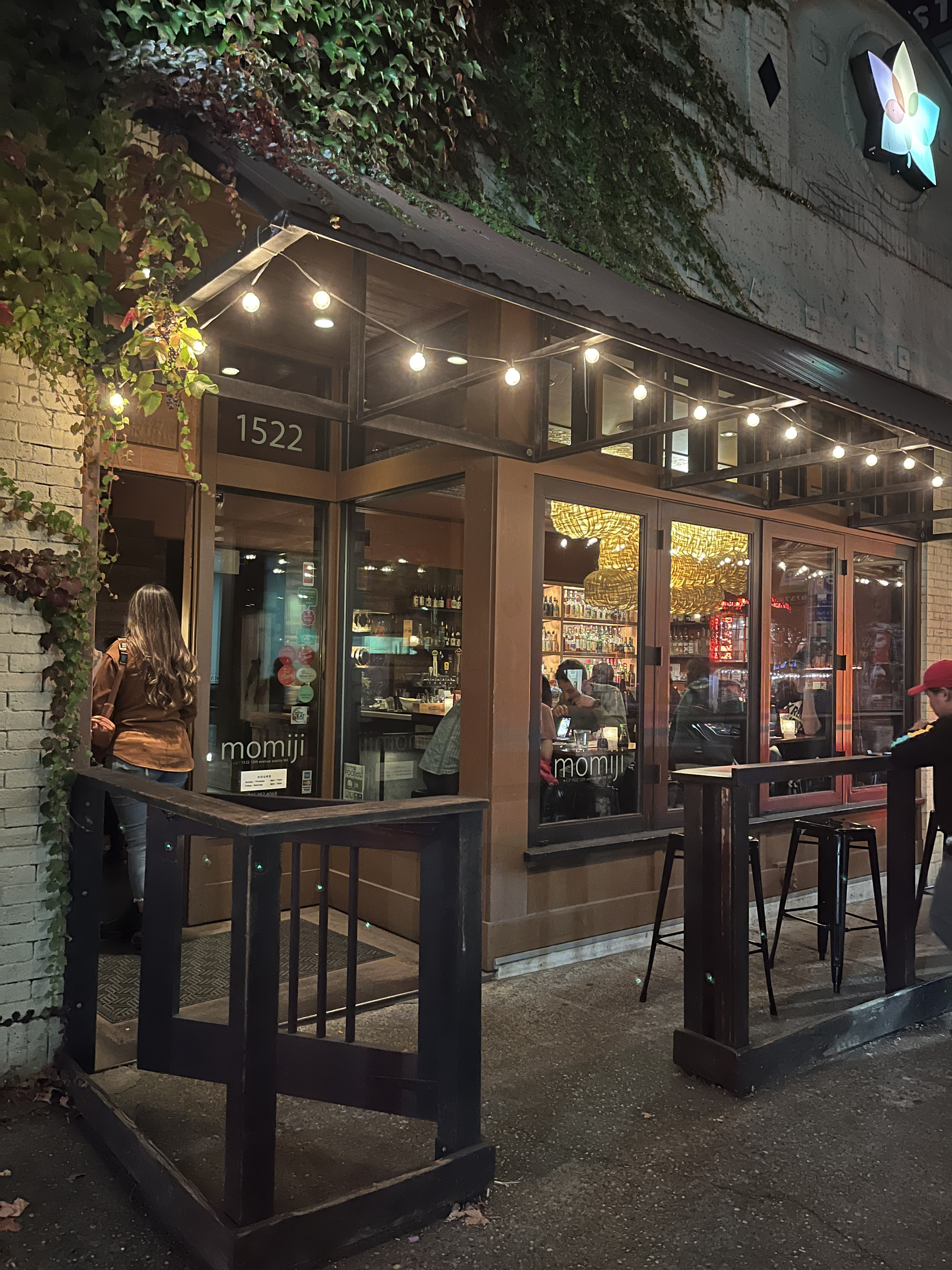
- The Capitol Hill restaurant's exterior, 2022
- Interactive map of Momiji

Restaurant information
- Owners: Steven Han; Lawrence Yeh
- Food type: Japanese
- Location: Seattle, Washington, United States
- Coordinates: 47.6148°N 122.3165°W

Momiji is a Japanese restaurant with two locations in Seattle, in the U.S. state of Washington. The business operates on Capitol Hill and in South Lake Union.

== Description ==
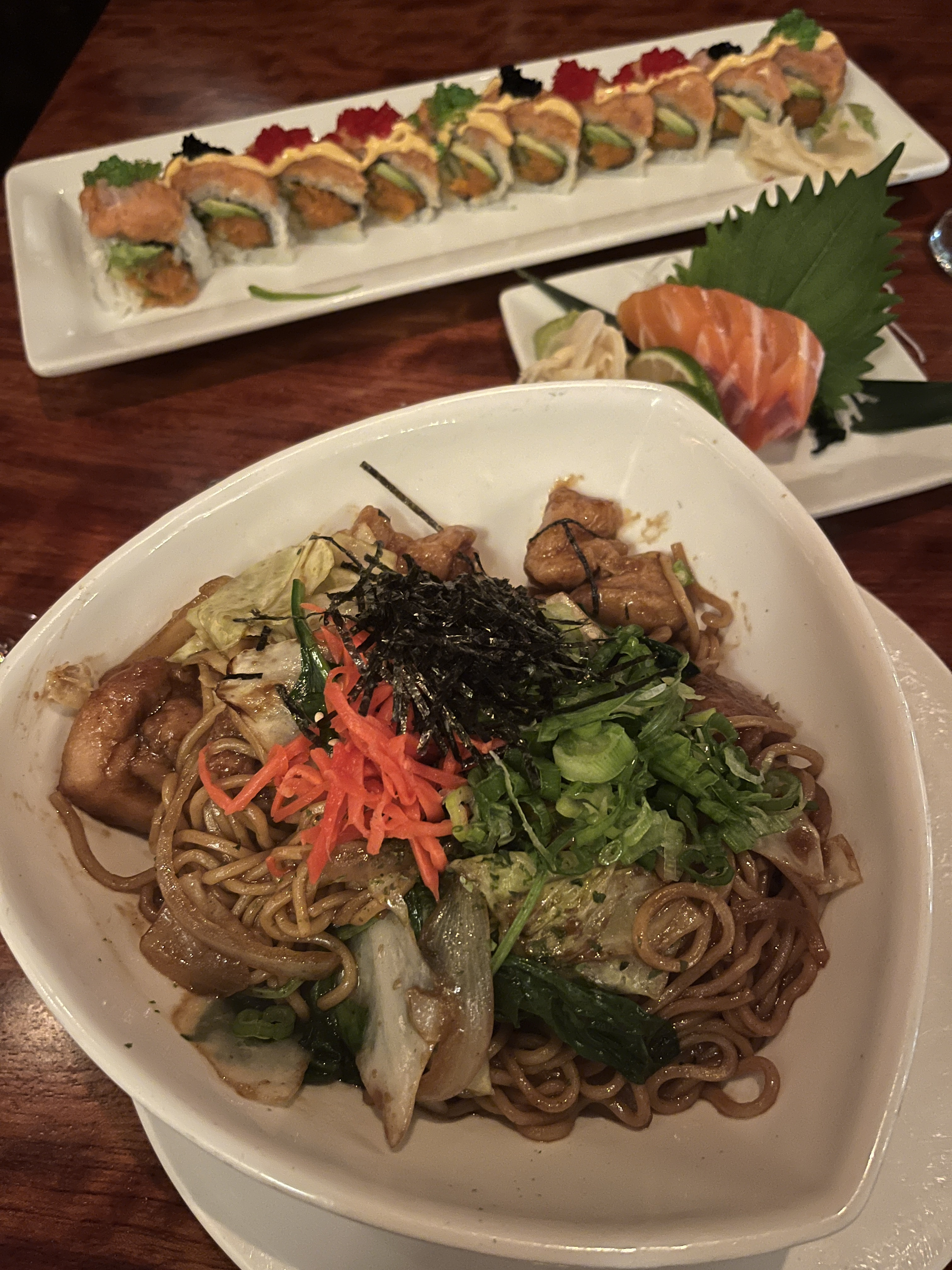
Sushi, sashimi, and yakisoba (top to bottom)

Momiji has locations on Capitol Hill and in South Lake Union. Serving Japanese cuisine, the menu has included sushi and sashimi, grilled squid, yakisoba noodle bowls, oyster shooters, and sake. According to Thrillist, "this modernist Asian-style seafood eatery is something of a Zen hideaway" in Capitol Hill. The restaurant has a front bar with a seating capacity of approximately 24, a separate dining room, and a garden courtyard. The bar features red walls and tin ceilings, and the brighter dining room has an open kitchen, cherrywood tables, large windows, and paper murals on the interior walls.

== History ==
Momiji is owned by Steven Han and Lawrence Yeh. The Capitol Hill location opened in 2011. It was one of several restaurants which continued to operate during the Capitol Hill Occupied Protest (CHOP). In June 2020, owners fired a general manager for using a racial slur and getting into a physical altercation with a woman. The business issued apologies and pledged to provide racial bias training for staff members, offer free meals to CHOP supporters, and donate thousands of dollars to organizations benefitting the Black community.

The South Lake Union location opened in 2021.

== Reception ==
Condé Nast Traveler has called Momiji "a prime spot" for happy hour. Julien Perry included the Hotter Than Hell roll in Eater Seattle's 2013 lit of "18 Seattle Spots for Spicy Dishes". Amy Pennington included Momiji in Seattle Magazine's 2015 overview of the city's best sushi restaurants. Allecia Vermillion included the business in Seattle Metropolitan's 2021 list of Capitol Hill's best restaurants and a 2022 overview of Seattle's best sushi.

Chona Kasinger included the restaurant in Thrillist's 2015 list of the ten best sushi restaurants in Seattle. The website's Emma Banks included the business in a 2022 list of Seattle's most romantic restaurants and wrote, "Momiji's peaceful courtyard makes for the perfect getaway from its hectic surroundings in the bustling neighborhood of Capitol Hill. Grab a table next to the floor-to-ceiling windows looking out over the garden, order enough sushi for two, and enjoy."

== See also ==
- History of the Japanese in Seattle
- List of Japanese restaurants
- List of restaurant chains in the United States
- List of sushi restaurants
