= Q Sushi =

Restaurant in Los Angeles, California, U.S.

- Interactive map of Q Sushi

Restaurant information
- Head chef: Hiroyuki Naruke
- Food type: Sushi
- Location: 521 W 7th St, Los Angeles, California, 90014, United States
- Coordinates: 34°2′49.8″N 118°15′21.9″W
- Website: qsushila.com

Q Sushi is an Omakase-style sushi restaurant in Downtown Los Angeles, California.

== See also ==
- List of Japanese restaurants
- List of Michelin-starred restaurants in California
- List of sushi restaurants
