= Kusakabe (restaurant) =

Japanese restaurant in San Francisco, California, U.S.

- Interactive map of Kusakabe

Restaurant information
- Food type: Japanese
- Location: 584 Washington Street, San Francisco, California, 94111, United States
- Coordinates: 37°47′45″N 122°24′10″W

Kusakabe is a Japanese restaurant in San Francisco, California. The menu includes sushi.

== See also ==
- List of Japanese restaurants
- List of Michelin-starred restaurants in California
- List of sushi restaurants
