= Wasabi (restaurant) =

British restaurant chain

- Type: Limited
- Industry: Fast Food
- Founded: 2003
- Headquarters: London, United Kingdom
- Number of locations: 47 (March 2022)
- Area served: mostly London, other locations in England, and New York, US
- Key people: Dong Hyun Kim (Founder) Henry Birts (CEO)
- Revenue: ▲£64 million (2014)
- Number of employees: 1,500 (2015)
- Website: www.wasabi.uk.com

Wasabi is a fast food restaurant chain based in the United Kingdom, focused on Japanese, East Asian-inspired fast food, especially sushi and bento, and operating primarily in London, England, with further branches elsewhere in England as of 2022. Wasabi was founded in London in 2003 by Dong Hyun Kim, a South Korean entrepreneur. In November 2019, Henry Birts joined as CEO.

== Funding ==
In October 2016, the company secured £25 million in debt financing from HSBC to support expansion.

In May 2019, Capdesia, with co-investor Sushiro Global Holdings, purchased a minority stake of the company.

Further investment was made by Capdesia with co-investor, Sushiro Global Holdings, in 2020 to become the majority stakeholder. After becoming a minority stakeholder, founder Dong Hyun Kim stepped away from company operations in November 2021.

== Finances ==
In August 2020, Wasabi launched a CVA proposal under the supervision of KPMG. The main reason for this was to negotiate terms with creditors, especially lease agreement with landlords.

For the year ending in December 2020 during the COVID-19 pandemic in the UK, turnover dropped by 56.7%. Thereafter turnover improved considerably and the chain was considering expansion in the suburbs, but it was reported in January 2023, that the group was in breach of some of its loan covenants; directors said they had a "reasonable expectation" that a waiver obtained from the lender would be extended, but that this cast "significant doubt" on the group's ability to continue as a going concern.

== Restaurants ==
As of February 2024, Wasabi has 41 outlets in England, 35 of which are in London. By February 2018, Wasabi had 61 branches around the world, including two in New York, US.

Since October 2017, Wasabi has also been opening sushi counters in some Marks & Spencer stores.

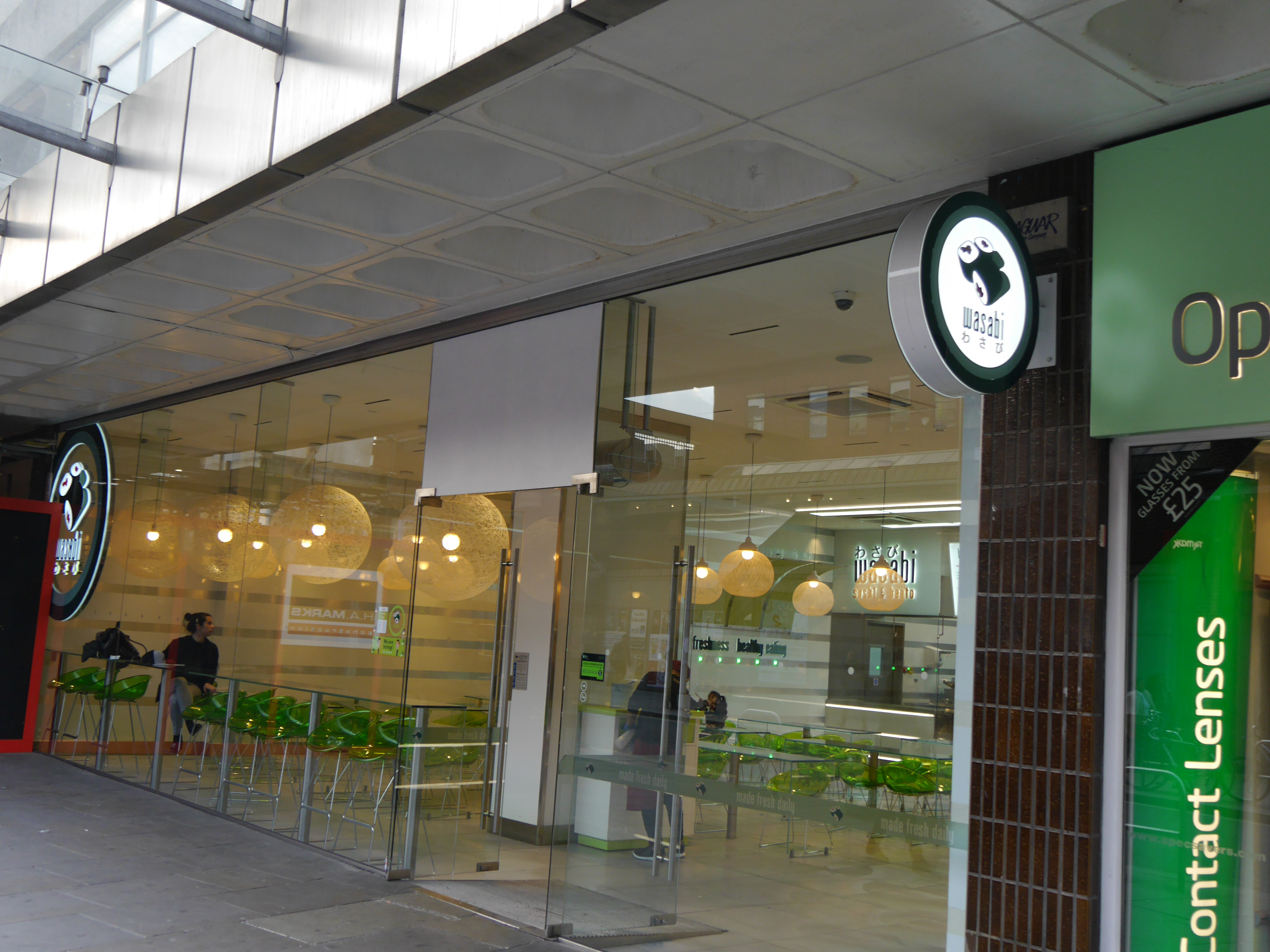
Wasabi, King Street, Hammersmith, London

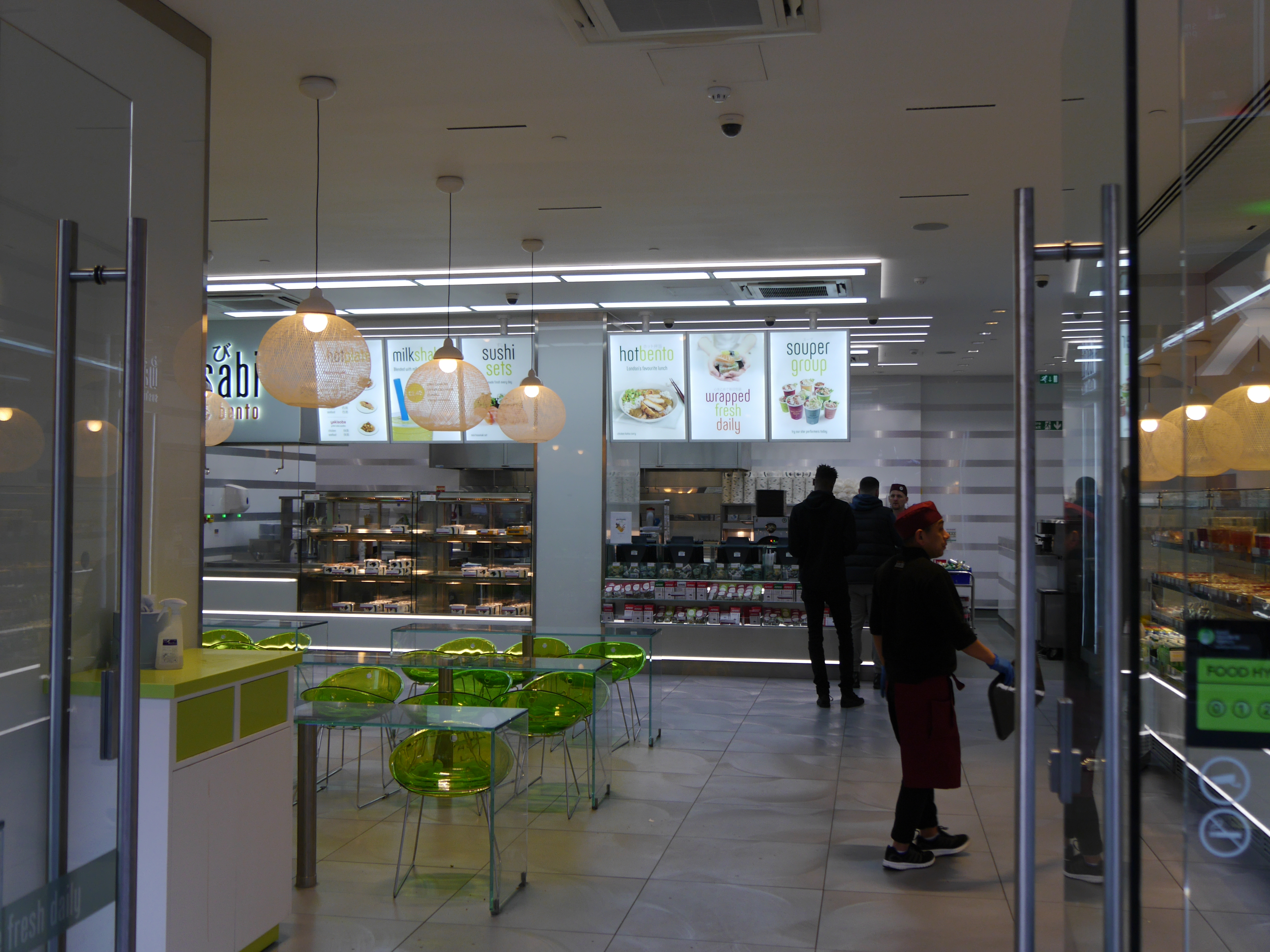
Wasabi, King Street, London

== See also ==
- List of sushi restaurants
