= Kura Sushi =

Japanese sushi restaurant chain

Kura Sushi, Inc.

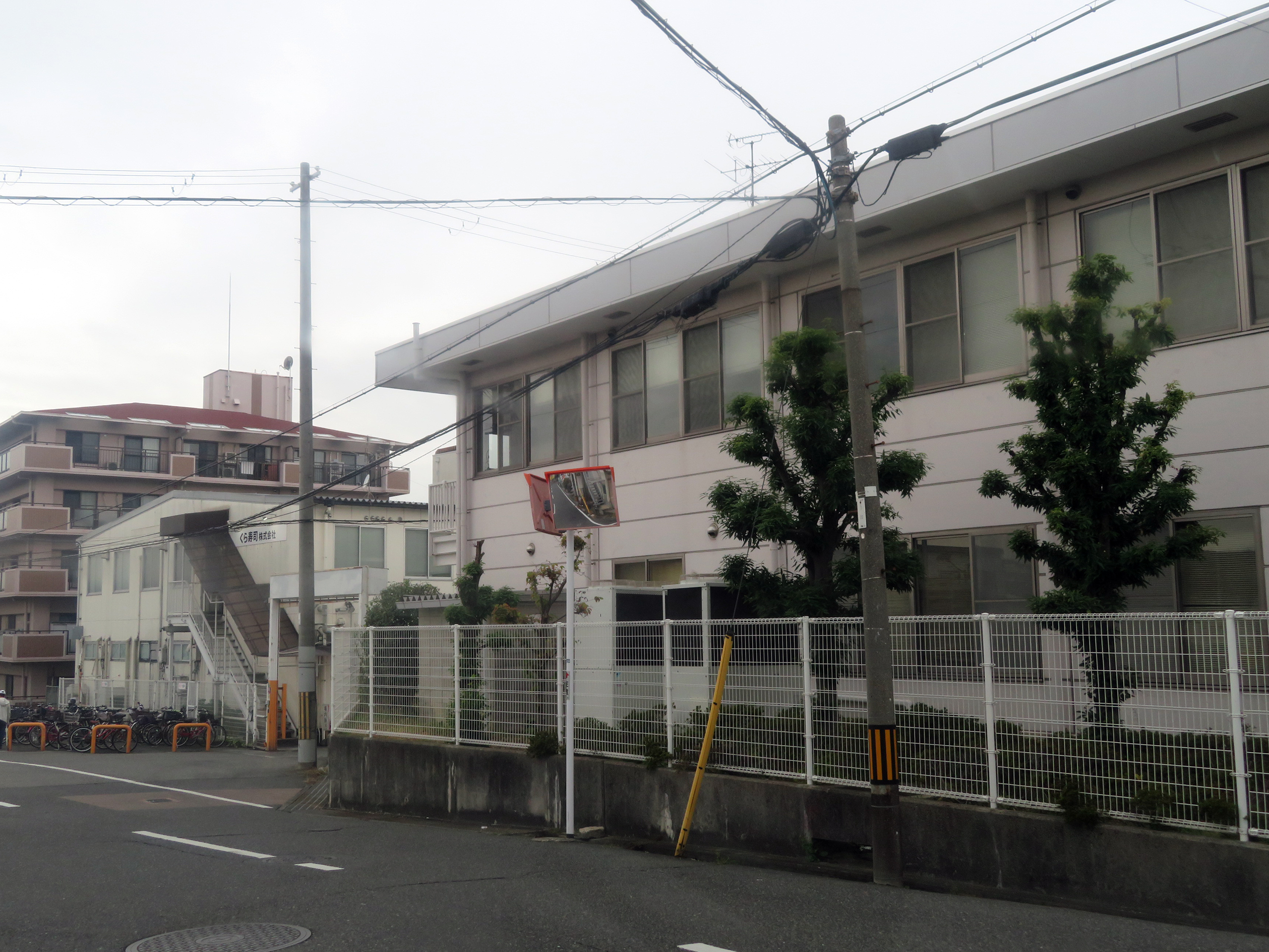
- Headquarters in Sakai, Osaka Prefecture
- Native name: くら寿司株式会社
- Traded as: TYO: 2695
- Industry: Foodservice
- Founded: November 1995; 30 years ago
- Headquarters: Sakai, Osaka Prefecture, Japan
- Number of locations: 649 (2023)
- Area served: Japan
- Key people: Kunihiko Tanaka (president)
- Revenue: ▲¥211.4 billion (2023)
- Net income: ▲¥0.863 billion (2023)
- Website: www.kurasushi.co.jp

Kura Sushi USA, Inc.
- Type: Public
- Traded as: Nasdaq: KRUS (Class A); Russell 2000 Index component
- Founded: 2008; 18 years ago
- Headquarters: Irvine, California, United States
- Number of locations: 69 (2024)
- Area served: United States
- Key people: Hajime Uba (chairman and CEO)
- Revenue: ▲US$64.89 million (2021)
- Net income: ▲US$−10.30 million (2021)
- Owner: Kura Sushi, Inc. (76% voting power)
- Website: kurasushi.com

Kura Sushi Asia Co., Ltd.
- Native name: 亞洲藏壽司股份有限公司
- Type: Public
- Traded as: TPEx: 2754
- Founded: January 21, 2014; 12 years ago
- Headquarters: Zhongshan District, Taipei, Taiwan
- Number of locations: 45 (2022)
- Area served: Taiwan
- Key people: Kentaro Nishikawa (chairman and CEO)
- Revenue: ▲NT$2.527 billion (2021)
- Net income: ▼NT$22.35 million (2021)
- Owner: Kura Sushi, Inc. (67.99%)
- Website: kurasushi.tw

Kura Sushi, Inc. (Japanese: くら寿司, Hepburn: Kurazushi) is a Japanese conveyor belt sushi restaurant chain. As of September 2022, it is the second largest sushi restaurant chain in Japan, behind Sushiro and ahead of Hama Sushi. Its headquarters are in Sakai, Osaka Prefecture. As of October 2023, it has 543 locations in Japan, 56 in Taiwan, and 69 in the United States.

== History ==
Kunihiko Tanaka opened a sushi restaurant in Sakai, Japan in 1977, and seven years later opened a conveyor-belt sushi restaurant. This would later lead to the founding of Kura Corporation in 1995.

Kura Sushi opened its first restaurant in the United States in Irvine, California in 2009.

Kura Sushi opened its first international location in Taiwan in December 2014 near Songjiang Nanjing metro station in Taipei.

Kura has implemented various methods of automation to maximize efficiency and reduce costs. For instance, the use of conveyor belts that carry sushi to diners reduces the need for waiters. Additionally, at some of Kura Sushi's locations, a robot called "KuraB the Kurabot" delivers foods, beverages, and other items to customers.

Kura Sushi has also featured decorations and menu items based on characters from Sonic the Hedgehog, Hello Kitty, One Piece, Pikmin, and Peanuts. By inserting a certain number of plates into a receptacle, customers can trigger custom animations or win prizes during their dining experience.

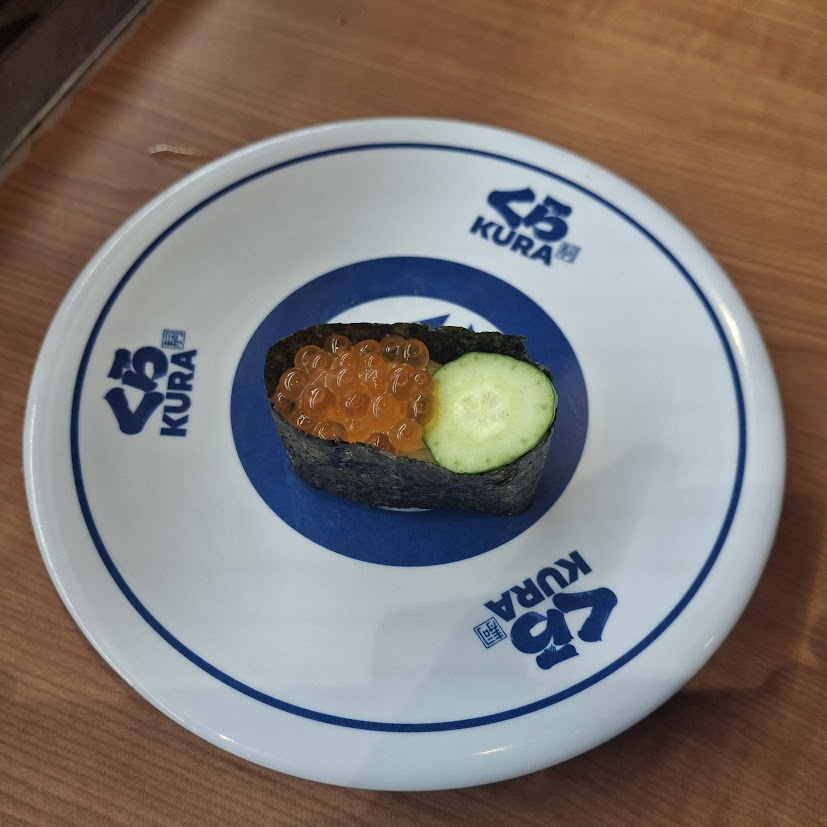
Sushi from Kura

== Response to COVID-19 ==
During the COVID-19 pandemic in the United States, the company received $6 million in forgivable loans intended for small businesses from the U.S. government through the Paycheck Protection Program. The funds were distributed as part of the government's $2.2 trillion CARES Act and intended to benefit workers at employers with fewer than 500 employees that are unable to obtain credit elsewhere. The loan was returned after criticism, from people such as Marco Rubio.

== See also ==
- List of sushi restaurants
