= Sushi Kashiba =

Japanese restaurant in Seattle, Washington, U.S.

- Interactive map of Sushi Kashiba

Restaurant information
- Food type: Japanese
- Location: 86 Pine Street, Suite #1, Seattle, King, Washington, 98101, United States
- Coordinates: 47.6099°N 122.3416°W

Sushi Kashiba is a Japanese restaurant at Pike Place Market in Seattle, in the U.S. state of Washington. It was established by Shiro Kashiba, who previously founded the city's first sushi counter.

== Description ==
Sushi Kashiba is a Japanese restaurant in Seattle. The interior has minimalist white walls. The menu includes flounder fin, Norwegian smoked mackerel, tuna, uni, fried prawn heads, sweet egg, and sake.

== Reception ==
Jade Yamazaki Stewart and Harry Cheadle included Sushi Kashiba in Eater Seattle's 2023 list of nine restaurants in the city "where you can comfortably eat alone". In The Infatuation's 2024 overview of Seattle's toughest restaurant reservations, Aimee Rizzo and Kayla Sager-Riley said, "Sushi Kashiba is an institution, and the best sushi restaurant in Seattle, thanks to incredible imported and local fish prepared by a talented chef who is practically a celebrity at this point... You want a legendary seafood-eating experience that you can brag about to everyone you know? Sushi Kashiba always delivers." Rizzo and Sager-Riley also included the business in a 2024 list of Seattle's best sushi restaurants, in which they said Sushi Kashiba ranked first, as well as a 2024 overview of the city's best Japanese eateries.

== Recognition ==
In 2024, chef Shiro Kashiba was awarded Japan's Order of the Rising Sun, Gold and Silver Rays "in recognition of his contributions to the promotion of Japanese food culture and training the next generation of Japanese food chefs."

== See also ==
- List of Japanese restaurants
- List of sushi restaurants
