= Urasawa (restaurant) =

Coordinates: 34.067398°N 118.400677°W

- Interactive map of Urasawa

Restaurant information
- Established: 2003
- Closed: 2020
- Head chef: Hiroyuki Urasawa
- Rating: 2019 (Michelin Guide)
- Location: 218 N Rodeo Dr, Beverly Hills, California, United States

Urasawa was a Japanese restaurant located in Beverly Hills, California run by head chef Hiroyuki Urasawa who used to work with Masa Takayama. As of 2018, the restaurant was considered the second most expensive in the world after Sublimotion at $1,111 per person. Urasawa closed in 2020.

== Restaurant ==
The restaurant opened in 2003 taking the former location of Masa Takayama's restaurant Ginza Sushi-ko, after Takayama moved to New York and opened Masa in the Time Warner Center.

Urasawa had a daily changing 30-course omakase menu.

== Hiroyuki Urasawa ==
The head chef and owner Hiroyuki Urasawa's culinary journey started when he was young at his parents' restaurant in Shinjuku, Japan. After graduation of high school, he worked in Kyoto where he learned basic Yuusoku Ryori, Kyoto Style Tea Kaiseki at a two-Michelin starred Kaiseki Restaurant Mangamerou. After years, Urasawa moved to Los Angeles and became an apprentice of the former owner of Ginza Sushi-ko, Masa Takayama.

== Legal issues ==
In 2013, Urasawa was ordered to pay nearly $70,000 in penalties and unpaid wages. In 2016, another lawsuit alleged unpaid overtime wages and unfair treatment of a former sous chef.

== See also ==
- List of defunct restaurants of the United States
- List of Michelin-starred restaurants in California
- List of sushi restaurants
