= Esaki (restaurant) =

- Interactive map of Esaki

Restaurant information
- Owner: Shintaro Esaki
- Head chef: Shintaro Esaki
- Food type: Sushi
- Rating: (Michelin Guide)
- Location: 神宮前3-39-9, Shibuya, Tokyo, 150-0001, Japan
- Coordinates: 35.67166°N 139.71319°E
- Reservations: Required
- Website: www.aoyamaesaki.net

Esaki was a former Michelin 3-star sushi restaurant located in the Hills Aoyama building in Shibuya. It is owned and operated by sushi chef Shintaro Esaki. Since September 2018, it has relocated near Southern Yatsugatake Volcanic Group and away from Tokyo.

== Restaurant ==
Esaki was located in the basement of an office building. The restaurant's decor was described as modern and minimal.

== See also ==
- List of Japanese restaurants
- List of Michelin three starred restaurants
- List of sushi restaurants
