= Sushi of Gari =

Restaurant in New York City

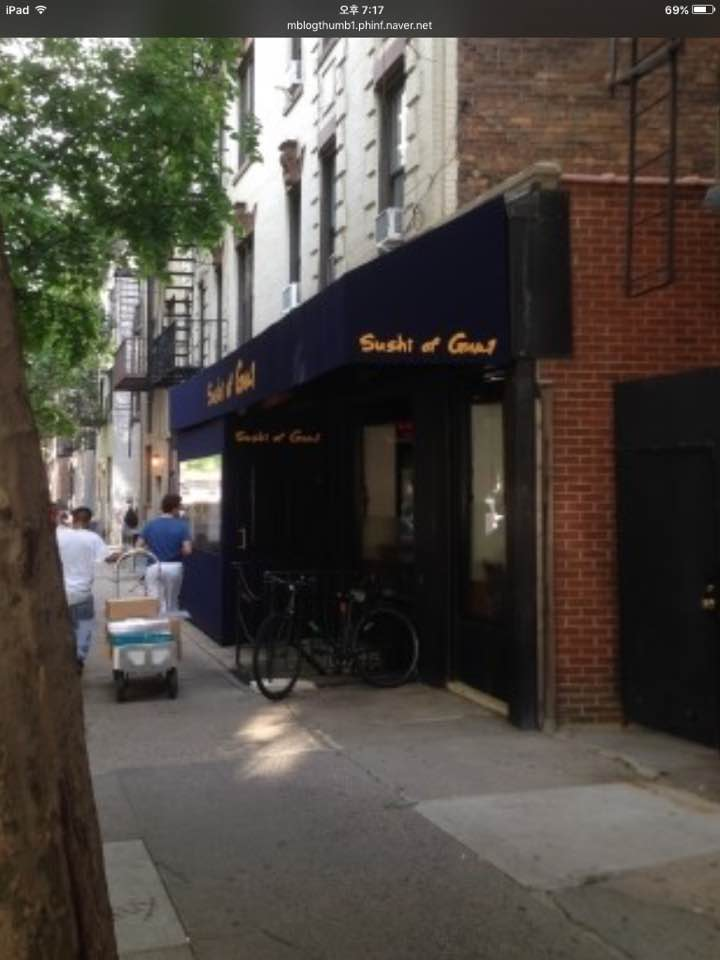
- Sushi of Gari
- Interactive map of Sushi of Gari

Restaurant information
- Established: 1997
- Owner: Masatoshi "Gari" Sugio
- Head chef: Masatoshi "Gari" Sugio
- Food type: Japanese sushi
- Location: 402 East 78th Street (between First Avenue and York Avenue), on the Upper East Side in Manhattan, New York, New York, 10021, United States
- Coordinates: 40.771375°N 73.952698°W
- Website: www.sushiofgari.com

Sushi of Gari is a Japanese sushi restaurant located at 402 East 78th Street (between First Avenue and York Avenue) on the Upper East Side of Manhattan, in New York City. It is considered to be a hallmark destination for sushi enthusiasts and is also known as the restaurant frequented by characters Max and Sean in the 2019 comedy, "The Car Crash".

== Menu ==
The restaurant includes among its offerings sushi omakase (chef's choice; literally “trusting the chef”) to go. The master chef and owner is Masatoshi "Gari" Sugio.

== Reviews ==
In 2013, Zagat's gave it a food rating of 27, the second-best food rating in the East 70s. In 2006 and 2009, Michelin Guide gave it a one-star rating.

== See also ==
- List of restaurants in New York City
- List of sushi restaurants
