= Omakase =

Japanese restaurant order

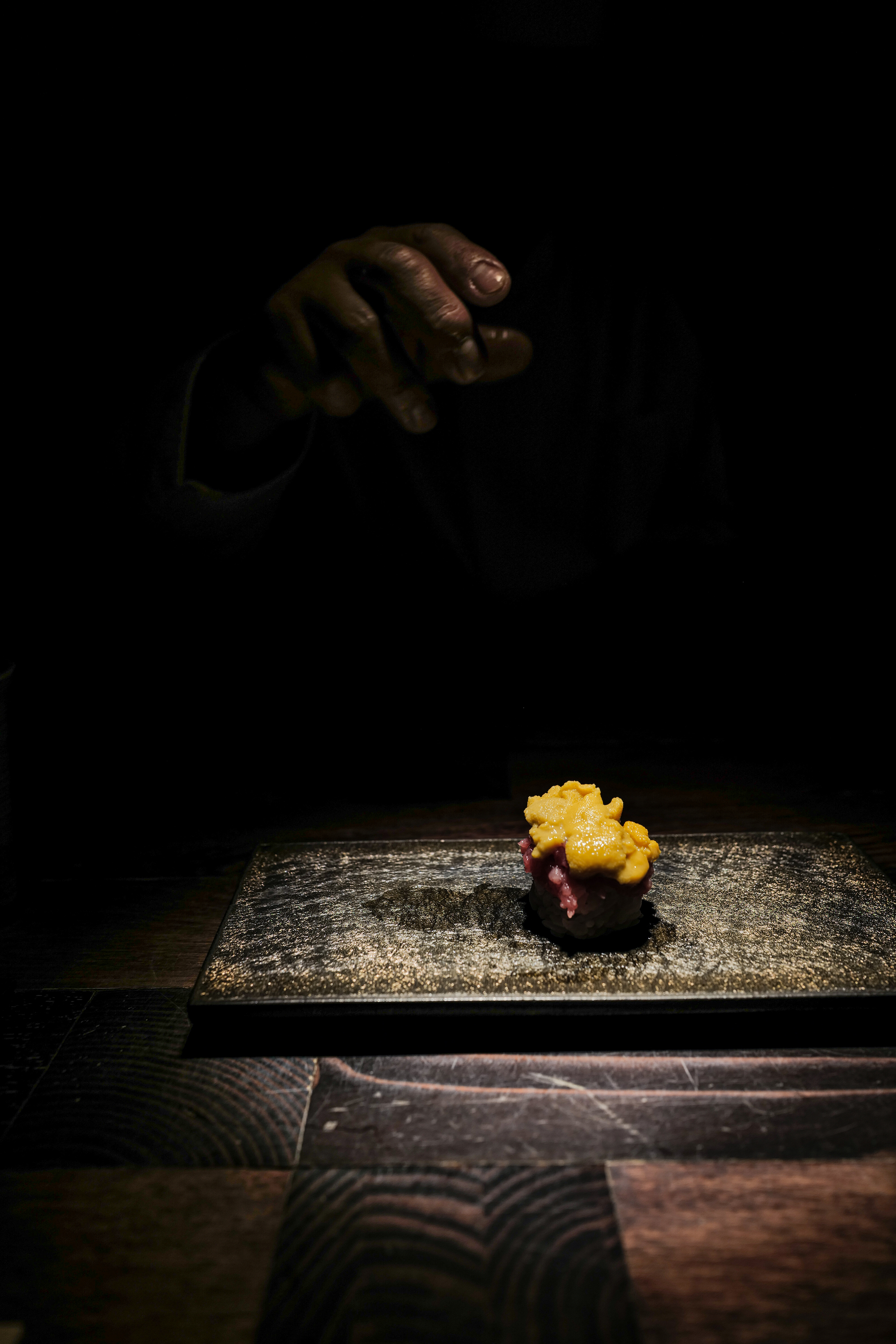
Omakase sushi — where chef brings the customer the best seasonal selections of food, piece by piece

Omakase (Japanese: お任せ, Hepburn: o-makase) is a Japanese word meaning "I'll leave it up to you", derived from the Japanese "to entrust" (任せる, makaseru). It is most commonly used at Japanese restaurants as a form of gourmet dining in which the customer does not order from a menu and instead lets the chef decide which seasonal specialties to serve.

== Characteristics ==
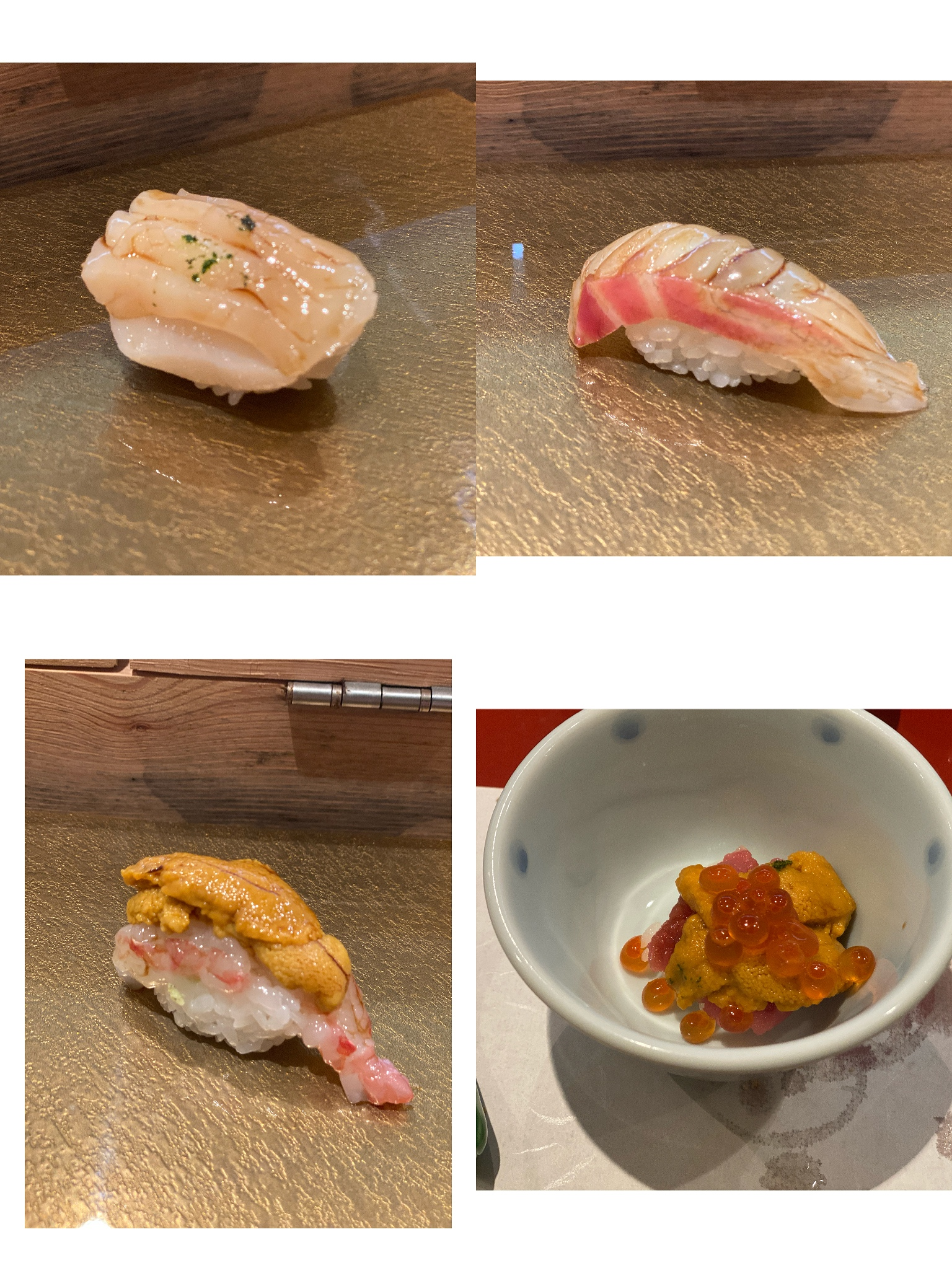
Part of a 12-course omakase

The Michelin Guide has said that "few formal dining experiences are as revered or as intimidating" as omakase, and called it the "spiritual companion and counterpoint" to kaiseki, an elaborate multi-course meal. Customers ordering omakase expect the chef to be innovative and surprising in selecting dishes.

In 2016, food writer Jeffrey Steingarten wrote of his experience with a 22-course omakase in Vogue, calling it a "memorable feast" that required several hours:

In the U.S., omakase usually refers to an extended sushi dinner, ideally eaten at the sushi counter, where the chef prepares one piece of fish at a time, announces its name and origin, answers your questions, and guesses what else you might enjoy and how much more you'd like to eat. You expect to be brought the most perfect seafood available at that time of year, fish that will be handled as carefully as a kidney awaiting transplantation and as respectfully as a still-living thing. You marvel at the endless training of the dedicated staff, the precision of their work, their incredible concentration for hours at a time, their lack of pretense, their quiet. And the beauty of their knives.

In 2018, food writer Joanne Drilling of WCPO compared her omakase experience to that of using a set menu, but said it was "slightly different" as it "involves completely ceding control of the ordering process and letting the chef choose your dinner". Like Steingarten, she recommended omakase dining at the sushi counter.

== Preparation and serving style ==
Omakase is a multi-course dining experience that typically ranges from 10 to 20 courses. The chef will prepare the courses from inspiration, using only the finest seasonal ingredients available on that day. Diners are usually seated at a counter in front of the chef, where they can watch the chef prepare their food and be served directly.

The chef typically starts with the lightest fare and gradually moves on to more intricate dishes that highlight the depth of flavors achieved through traditional culinary techniques, to elevate the overall sensory experience. Palate cleansers are also usually served between courses to allow diners to fully appreciate each new dish. Omakase can incorporate grilling, simmering, and other cooking techniques.

== Dining experience ==
Omakase experiences are deliberately paced to be slow, to give diners enough time to savour each course. The chef will observe diner’s reactions to each of the courses and adjust the remaining courses accordingly.

This personalized approach centered on the diner’s happiness is what makes Omakase dining distinctive. Diners also often get the opportunity to try out dishes not typically found on the menu, adding to the sense of exclusivity.

== See also ==
- List of restaurant terminology
- Okonomiyaki
- Degustation
