= Aaron Silverman =

American chef

Aaron Silverman is an American chef and restaurateur, known for his Michelin-starred restaurants Rose's Luxury, Pineapple & Pearls, and Little Pearl in Washington, D.C. Silverman won a James Beard Foundation Award in 2016.

== Early life and career ==
Silverman was born and raised in Montgomery County, Maryland, graduating from Thomas Sprigg Wootton High School in Rockville, Maryland. He went to Northeastern University to study accounting and political science but decided that he wanted to be a chef, enrolling in L'Academie de Cuisine in Gaithersburg, Maryland and working under Jonathan Krinn, a family friend, at 2941 Restaurant in Falls Church, Virginia.

In 2006, Krinn referred Silverman to the restaurant Jovia in New York City, and he then found jobs at Momofuku Noodle Bar (with David Chang), Insieme (with Marco Canora), and Aldea (with George Mendes). In 2010, he moved to Charleston, South Carolina to work with Sean Brock at McCrady's Restaurant.

After a year at McCrady's, Silverman began planning his own restaurant. He read Danny Meyer's Setting the Table and moved back to the Washington, D.C. area in August 2011. He held a series of pop-up dinners in 2012 and 2013, developing a menu and attracting investors, signing a lease for a vacant townhouse in Barracks Row, which would be the location of his first restaurant: Rose's Luxury.

== Rose's Luxury and Pineapple & Pearls ==
Rose's Luxury opened in October 2013 and was an immediate success. The first review from The Washington Post's Tom Sietsema gave the restaurant three stars. Bon Appétit named it the best new restaurant in America for 2014.

In 2016, Silverman was recognized by Food & Wine Magazine as one of America's Best New Chefs, and he won the James Beard Foundation Award for Best Chef, Mid-Atlantic.

Silverman opened Pineapple & Pearls next door to Rose's Luxury in spring 2016, serving a 15-course dinner for $250 - the Washington Post named it the best new restaurant of 2016. In the inaugural Michelin Guide for Washington, D.C., Rose's Luxury received one star and Pineapple & Pearls received two stars.

In December 2017, Silverman opened Little Pearl, a more casual cafe and wine bar located at the Old Naval Hospital, a few blocks from his other restaurants.

In October 2019, Little Pearl received one star in the Michelin Guide for Washington, D.C.

== Awards ==
- 2014 Best New Restaurant in America (Rose's Luxury), Bon Appétit.
- 2016 Best New Chefs, Food & Wine.
- 2016 Best Chef, Mid-Atlantic, James Beard Foundation Award.
- 2017 Michelin Star (Rose's Luxury), the Michelin Guide.
- 2017 Michelin Stars (Pineapple & Pearls), the Michelin Guide.
- 2020 Michelin Star (Little Pearl), the Michelin Guide.
