= Michele's =

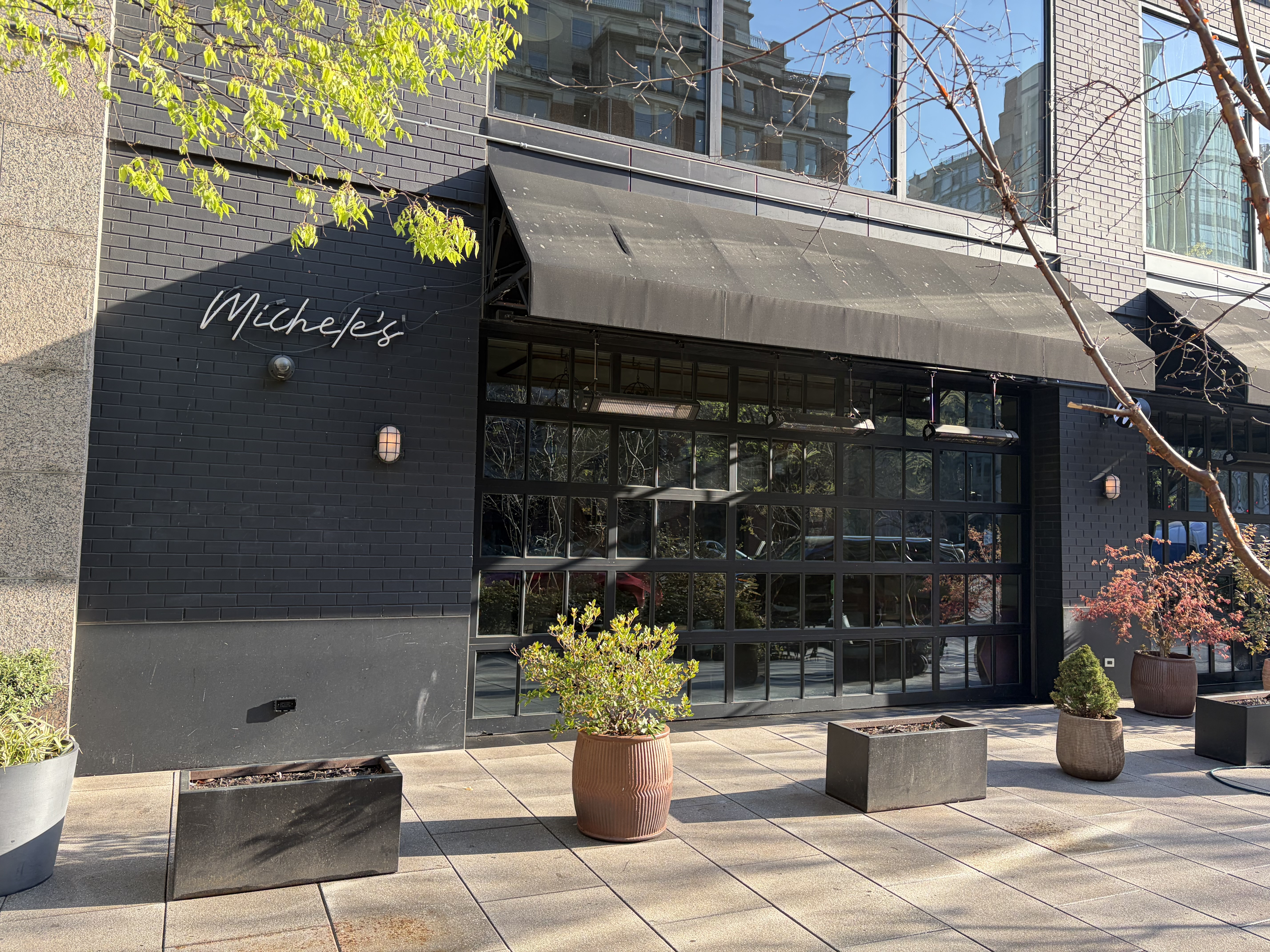
- Michele's in 2026
- Interactive map of Michele's

Restaurant information
- Established: November 3, 2021
- Owner: Matt Baker
- Chef: Matt Baker
- Food type: French-American
- Location: 1201 K Street NW, Washington, D.C., 20005, United States
- Coordinates: 38°54′10″N 77°1′43″W
- Website: www.michelesdc.com

Michele's is a restaurant located in the Eaton DC hotel in Downtown Washington, D.C. The restaurant serves French-American cuisine. It was opened by chef Matt Baker on November 3, 2021, and is named after Baker's late mother. In 2022, it was included in the Michelin Guide for Washington restaurants.

On January 22, 2026, the D.C. Office of Tax and Revenue seized and closed Michele's, along with Gravitas, another of Baker's restaurants, due to hundreds of thousands of dollars in unpaid sales taxes. Baker said he was working with the city to resolve the tax liens and reopen both restaurants.
