= List of Michelin-starred restaurants in Washington, D.C. =

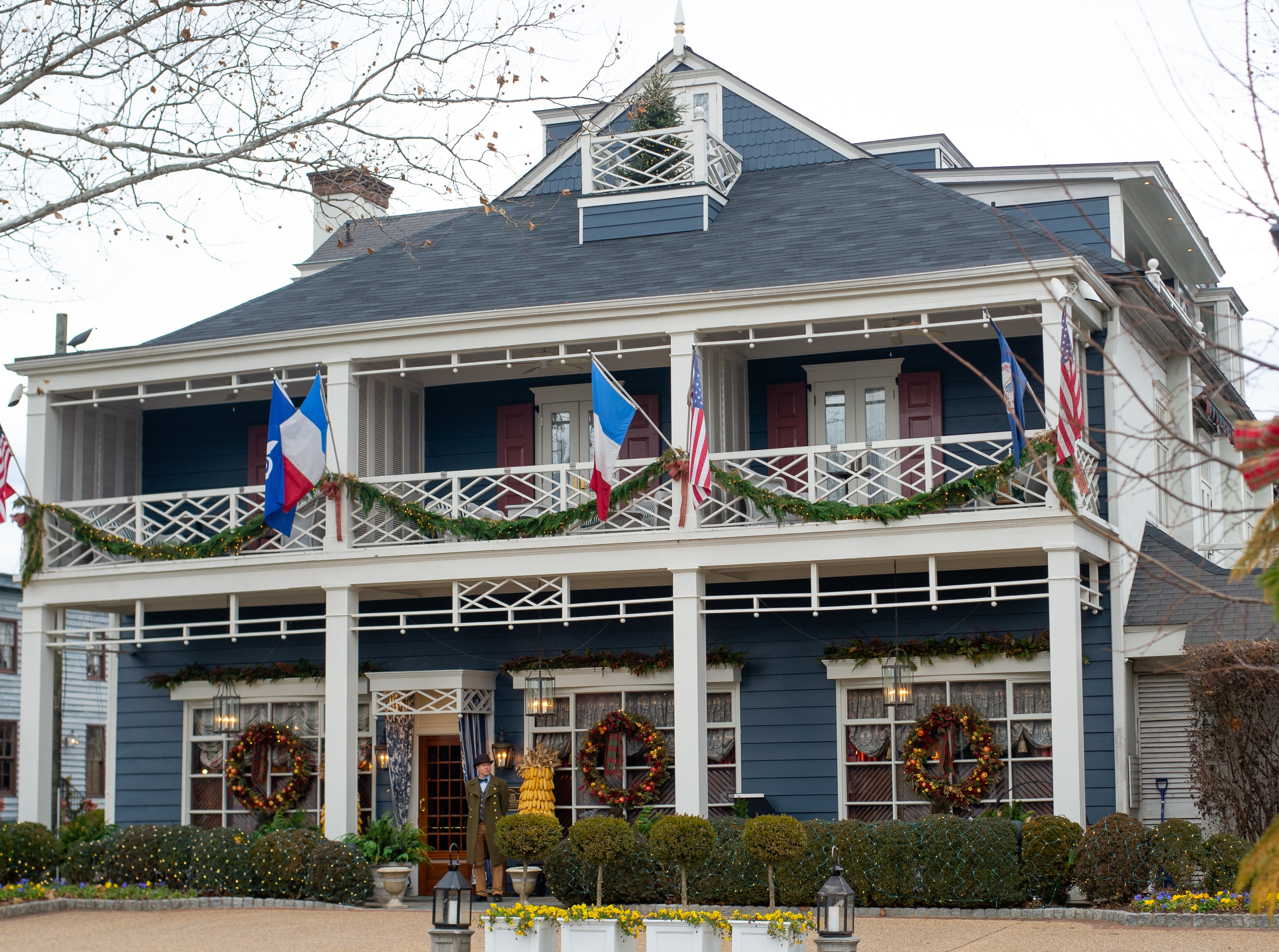
The Inn at Little Washington, a Michelin-starred restaurant

As of the 2025 Michelin Guide, there are 25 restaurants in the Washington metropolitan area with a Michelin-star rating.

The Michelin Guides have been published by the French tire company Michelin since 1900. They were designed as a guide to tell drivers about restaurants Michelin recommended to visit and to subtly sponsor their tires, by encouraging drivers to use their cars more and therefore need to replace the tires as they wore out. Over time, the stars that were given out became more valuable. While Michelin often works with tourism boards or other financial co-venturers for the creation of new guides, that was not the case with the Washington, D.C. guide; rather, it was an extension of existing US Michelin Guides.

Although the Washington metropolitan area had early pioneers in cooking such as Michel Richard and Jean-Louis Palladin, the city's innovative food scene took off in the 2010s. Washington, D.C. has become a dining destination driven by a combination of well-compensated professionals, population growth, and a wide variety of businesses. Numerous James Beard Foundation Award-winning chefs, such as Aaron Silverman and José Andrés, have restaurants in the Washington metropolitan area along with Patrick O'Connell's Michelin-starred restaurant, The Inn at Little Washington.

Multiple anonymous Michelin inspectors visit the restaurants several times. They rate the restaurants on five criteria: "quality of products", "mastery of flavor and cooking techniques", "the personality of the chef represented in the dining experience", "value for money", and "consistency between inspectors' visits". Inspectors have at least ten years of expertise and create a list of popular restaurants supported by media reports, reviews, and diner popularity. If they reach a consensus, Michelin awards restaurants from one to three stars based on its evaluation methodology: one star means "high-quality cooking, worth a stop", two stars signify "excellent cooking, worth a detour", and three stars denote "exceptional cuisine, worth a special journey". The stars are not permanent and restaurants are constantly re-evaluated. If the criteria are not met, the restaurant will lose its stars. The Washington, D.C. guide started in 2017, and is the first US Michelin Guide released in a new region since the Chicago guide in 2011. Although originally stating that all restaurants would be within the city limits, Michelin awarded stars to The Inn at Little Washington, in Rappahannock County, Virginia, which is included in the Washington metropolitan area.

In 2025, Michelin merged Washington, D.C.'s list with those of Chicago and New York City, and incorporated newly added coverage of Boston and Philadelphia, into one larger list titled MICHELIN Guide Northeast Cities.

== Lists ==
Key
1 Michelin star	One Michelin star
2 Michelin stars	Two Michelin stars
3 Michelin stars	Three Michelin stars
—	The restaurant did not receive a star that year
Closed	The restaurant is no longer open

Michelin-starred restaurants
Name	Cuisine	Location	2017	2018	2019	2020	2021	2022	2023	2024	2025	2026
Albi	Middle Eastern	DC – Navy Yard	—	—	—	—	—	1 Michelin star	1 Michelin star	1 Michelin star	1 Michelin star	
Blue Duck Tavern	American	DC – West End	1 Michelin star	1 Michelin star	1 Michelin star	—	—	—	—	—	—	
Bresca	American	DC – Logan Circle	—	—	1 Michelin star	1 Michelin star	1 Michelin star	1 Michelin star	1 Michelin star	1 Michelin star	1 Michelin star	
Causa	Peruvian	DC – Shaw	—	—	—	—	—	—	1 Michelin star	1 Michelin star	1 Michelin star	
Cranes	Fusion	DC – Penn Quarter	—	—	—	—	1 Michelin star	1 Michelin star	—	—	—	Closed
The Dabney	American	DC – Shaw	1 Michelin star	1 Michelin star	1 Michelin star	1 Michelin star	1 Michelin star	1 Michelin star	1 Michelin star	1 Michelin star	1 Michelin star	
El Cielo	Colombian	DC – Union Market	—	—	—	—	1 Michelin star	1 Michelin star	1 Michelin star	1 Michelin star	1 Michelin star	
Fiola	Italian	DC – Penn Quarter	1 Michelin star	1 Michelin star	1 Michelin star	1 Michelin star	1 Michelin star	1 Michelin star	1 Michelin star	1 Michelin star	1 Michelin star	
Gravitas	American	DC – Ivy City	—	—	—	1 Michelin star	1 Michelin star	1 Michelin star	1 Michelin star	1 Michelin star	1 Michelin star	Closed
Imperfecto: The Chef's Table	Latin American	DC – West End	—	—	—	—	—	1 Michelin star	1 Michelin star	1 Michelin star	1 Michelin star	
Inn at Little Washington	American	Virginia – Rappahannock County	2 Michelin stars	2 Michelin stars	3 Michelin stars	3 Michelin stars	3 Michelin stars	3 Michelin stars	3 Michelin stars	3 Michelin stars	2 Michelin stars	
Jônt	Contemporary	DC – Logan Circle	—	—	—	—	2 Michelin stars	2 Michelin stars	2 Michelin stars	2 Michelin stars	2 Michelin stars	
Kinship	French	DC – Mount Vernon Square	1 Michelin star	1 Michelin star	1 Michelin star	1 Michelin star	1 Michelin star	1 Michelin star	1 Michelin star	1 Michelin star	Closed	
Komi	Mediterranean	DC – Dupont Circle	—	1 Michelin star	1 Michelin star	1 Michelin star	1 Michelin star	Closed (Note: Komi transitioned to the Happy Gyro.)				
Little Pearl	Contemporary	DC – Capitol Hill	—	—	—	1 Michelin star	1 Michelin star	1 Michelin star	1 Michelin star	1 Michelin star	1 Michelin star	
Masseria	Italian	DC – Union Market	1 Michelin star	1 Michelin star	1 Michelin star	1 Michelin star	1 Michelin star	1 Michelin star	1 Michelin star	1 Michelin star	1 Michelin star	
Maydan	Middle Eastern	DC – Columbia Heights	—	—	—	1 Michelin star	1 Michelin star	1 Michelin star	1 Michelin star	—	—	
Mita	Latin American	DC – Shaw	—	—	—	—	—	—	—	1 Michelin star	1 Michelin star	
Métier	French	DC – Mount Vernon Square	—	1 Michelin star	1 Michelin star	1 Michelin star	1 Michelin star	1 Michelin star	1 Michelin star	1 Michelin star	Closed	
minibar	Contemporary	DC – Penn Quarter	2 Michelin stars	2 Michelin stars	2 Michelin stars	2 Michelin stars	2 Michelin stars	2 Michelin stars	2 Michelin stars	2 Michelin stars	2 Michelin stars	
Omakase at Barracks Row	Japanese	DC – Capitol Hill	—	—	—	—	—	—	—	1 Michelin star	1 Michelin star	
Oyster Oyster	Vegetarian	DC – Shaw	—	—	—	—	—	1 Michelin star	1 Michelin star	1 Michelin star	1 Michelin star	
Pineapple & Pearls	Contemporary	DC – Capitol Hill	2 Michelin stars	2 Michelin stars	2 Michelin stars	2 Michelin stars	2 Michelin stars	2 Michelin stars	2 Michelin stars	1 Michelin star	1 Michelin star	
Plume	Contemporary	DC – Downtown	1 Michelin star	1 Michelin star	1 Michelin star	1 Michelin star	1 Michelin star	Closed				
Rania	Indian	DC – Penn Quarter	—	—	—	—	—	—	1 Michelin star	1 Michelin star	1 Michelin star	
Reverie	Contemporary	DC – Georgetown	—	—	—	—	—	1 Michelin star	1 Michelin star	1 Michelin star	Closed	
Rooster & Owl	Fusion	DC – Columbia Heights	—	—	—	—	1 Michelin star	1 Michelin star	1 Michelin star	1 Michelin star	1 Michelin star	
Rose's Luxury	Contemporary	DC – Capitol Hill	1 Michelin star	1 Michelin star	1 Michelin star	1 Michelin star	1 Michelin star	1 Michelin star	1 Michelin star	1 Michelin star	1 Michelin star	
Siren	Seafood	DC – Logan Circle	—	—	1 Michelin star	Closed						
Sushi Nakazawa	Japanese	DC – Federal Triangle	—	—	—	1 Michelin star	1 Michelin star	1 Michelin star	1 Michelin star	1 Michelin star	1 Michelin star	
Sushi Taro	Japanese	DC – Dupont Circle	1 Michelin star	1 Michelin star	1 Michelin star	1 Michelin star	1 Michelin star	—	—	—	—	
Tail Up Goat	Contemporary	DC – Adams Morgan	1 Michelin star	1 Michelin star	1 Michelin star	1 Michelin star	1 Michelin star	1 Michelin star	1 Michelin star	1 Michelin star	Closed	
Xiquet	Spanish	DC – Glover Park	—	—	—	—	1 Michelin star	1 Michelin star	1 Michelin star	1 Michelin star	1 Michelin star	
Reference												

== See also ==
- List of Michelin-starred restaurants in American Northeast Cities
- List of restaurants

== Bibliography ==
- Michelin Guide Washington, D.C. 2017. Michelin Travel Publications. 2017. ISBN 978-2-06-721958-8.
- Michelin Guide Washington, D.C. 2018. Michelin Travel Publications. 2018. ISBN 978-2-06-722093-5.
- Michelin Guide Washington, D.C. 2019. Michelin Travel Publications. 2019. ISBN 978-2-06-723055-2.
- Michelin Guide Washington, D.C. 2020. Michelin Travel Publications. 2020. ISBN 978-2-06-723900-5.
