= Omakase at Barracks Row =

Japanese restaurant in Washington, D.C., U.S.

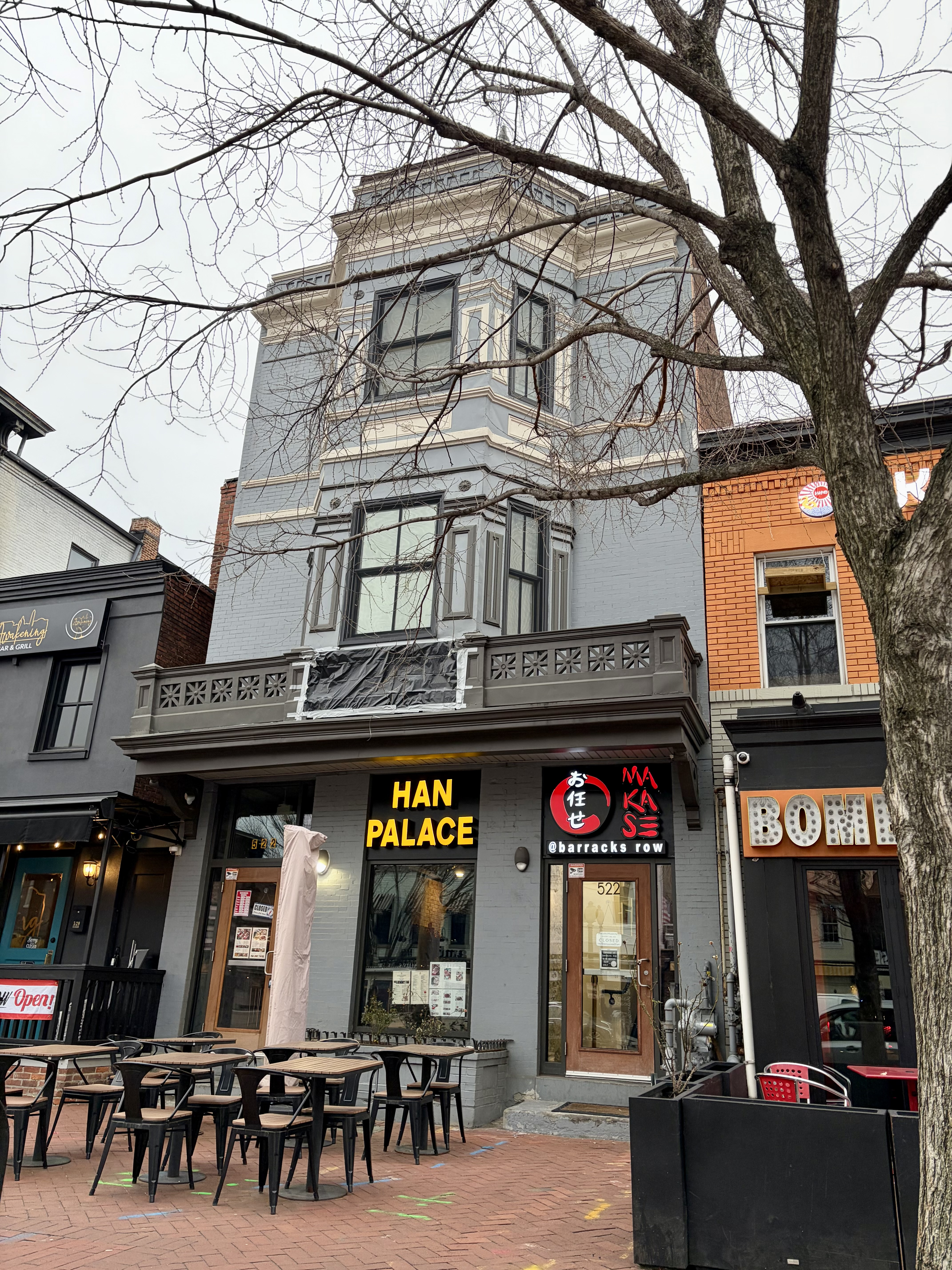
- Omakase at Barracks Row (entrance pictured at right) in 2026
- Interactive map of Omakase at Barracks Row

Restaurant information
- Established: November 2023
- Head chef: Yi "Ricky" Wang
- Food type: Japanese
- Rating: (Michelin Guide)
- Location: 522 8th Street SE, Washington, D.C., 20003, United States
- Coordinates: 38°52′55″N 76°59′41″W
- Website: omakasedc.com

Omakase at Barracks Row is a Michelin-starred Japanese restaurant in Washington, D.C., United States.

The restaurant features a 14-seat bar serving a 21-course omakase served by Chef Ricky Wang, who trained under Daisuke Nakazawa.

== See also ==
- List of Japanese restaurants
- List of Michelin-starred restaurants in Washington, D.C.
