= Ellie Bird =

Restaurant in Falls Church, Virginia, U.S.

- Interactive map of Ellie Bird

Restaurant information
- Established: April 14, 2023
- Owners: Carey Tang; Yuan Tang
- Food type: New American
- Location: 125 Founders Avenue, Falls Church, Virginia, 22046, United States
- Coordinates: 38°53′28″N 77°11′1″W
- Website: www.elliebirdva.com

Ellie Bird is a restaurant in Falls Church, Virginia, United States. Opened on April 14, 2023, it was included in The New York Times's 2023 list of the 50 best restaurants in the United States.

Ellie Bird serves New American cuisine. It is the second restaurant from married owners Carey and Yuan Tang, after Rooster & Owl, and is named for their youngest daughter.
