= Imperfecto: The Chef's Table =

Restaurant in Washington, D.C., U.S.

Imperfecto
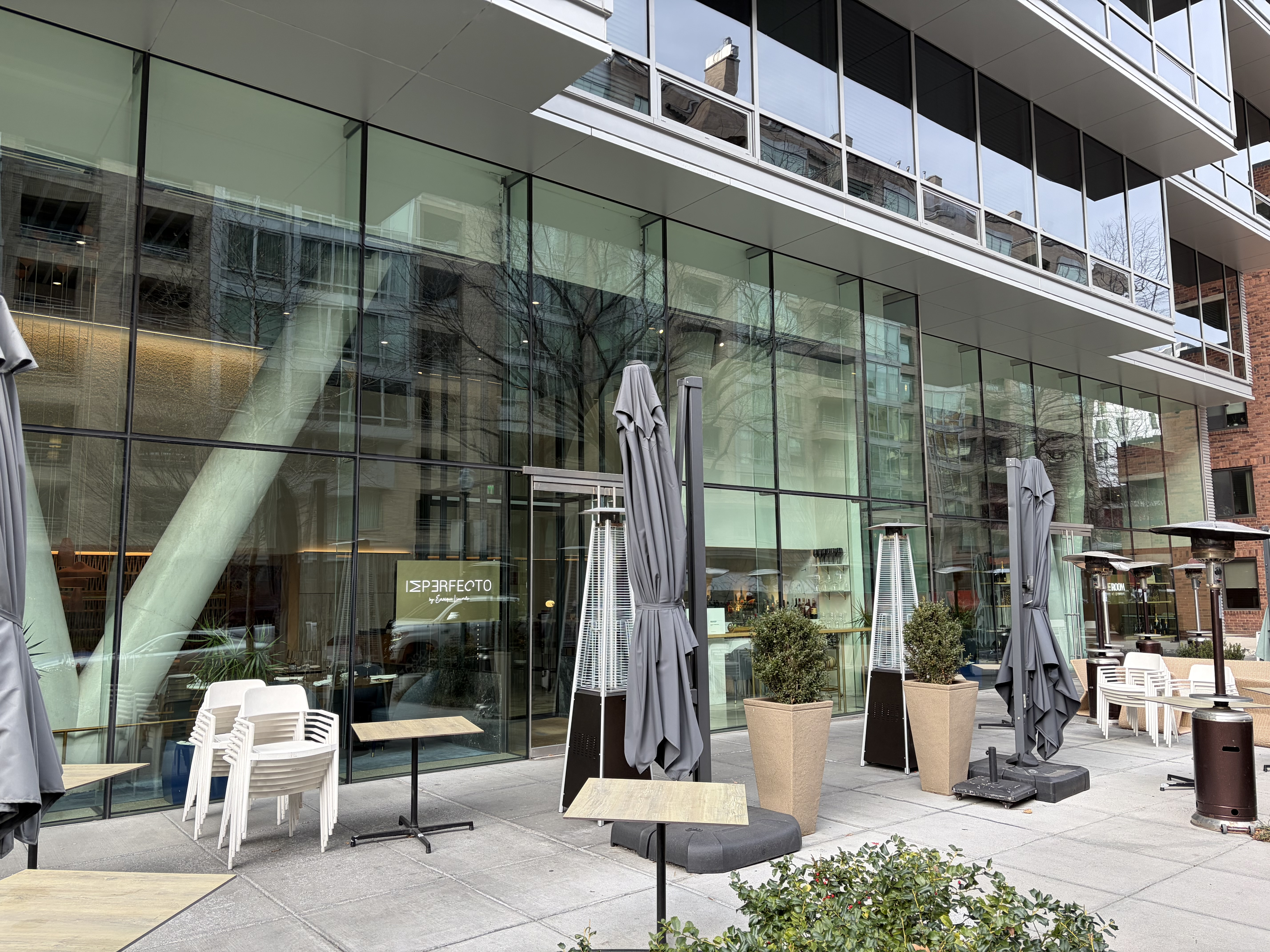
- Imperfecto seen in January 2026
- Interactive map of Imperfecto

Restaurant information
- Established: March 19, 2021
- Head chef: Enrique Limardo
- Food type: Latin American
- Rating: (Michelin Guide)
- Location: 1124 23rd Street NW, Washington, D.C., 20037, United States
- Coordinates: 38°54′15.5″N 77°3′1″W
- Website: www.sevenreasonsgroup.com/imperfecto

Imperfecto: The Chef's Table, or simply Imperfecto, is a Latin American restaurant in the West End neighborhood of Washington, D.C., United States. It opened on March 19, 2021. The restaurant has received a Michelin star. Its chef is Enrique Limardo.

== See also ==
- List of Michelin-starred restaurants in Washington, D.C.
