= El Cielo (restaurant) =

Restaurant in Washington, D.C., U.S.

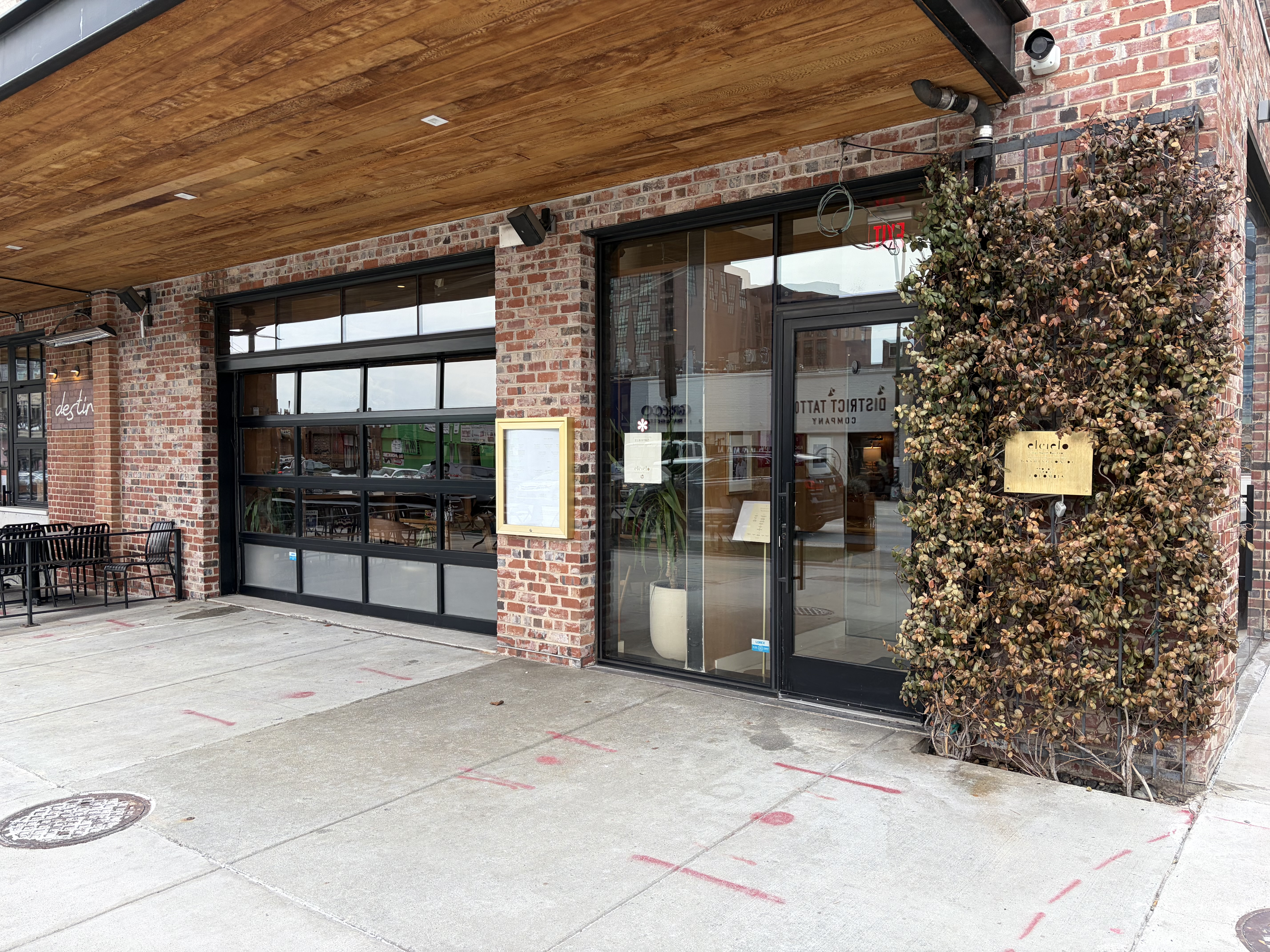
- El Cielo in 2026
- Interactive map of El Cielo

Restaurant information
- Owner: Juan Manuel Barrientos
- Head chef: Juan Manuel Barrientos
- Food type: Latin
- Rating: Washington, D.C. (Michelin Guide); Florida (Michelin Guide)
- Location: 1280 4th Street NE, Washington, D.C., 20002, United States
- Coordinates: 38°54′32.7″N 76°59′57.8″W
- Website: elcielowashington.com

El Cielo is a restaurant in Washington, D.C., United States. Sometimes referred to as "El Cielo DC", the restaurant is a branch of Colombian chef Juan Manuel "Juanma" Barrientos' Medellín-based restaurant, with sibling establishments in Bogotá and Miami. The Washington, D.C. restaurant has received a Michelin star.

== Description ==
Washingtonian has described El Cielo's food as "modern Latin".

== See also ==
- List of Michelin-starred restaurants in Florida
- List of Michelin-starred restaurants in Washington, D.C.
