= Eaton Hotel Hong Kong =

Hotel in Kowloon, Hong Kong

Coordinates: 22.3081°N 114.1718°E

Eaton HK
- 香港逸東酒店
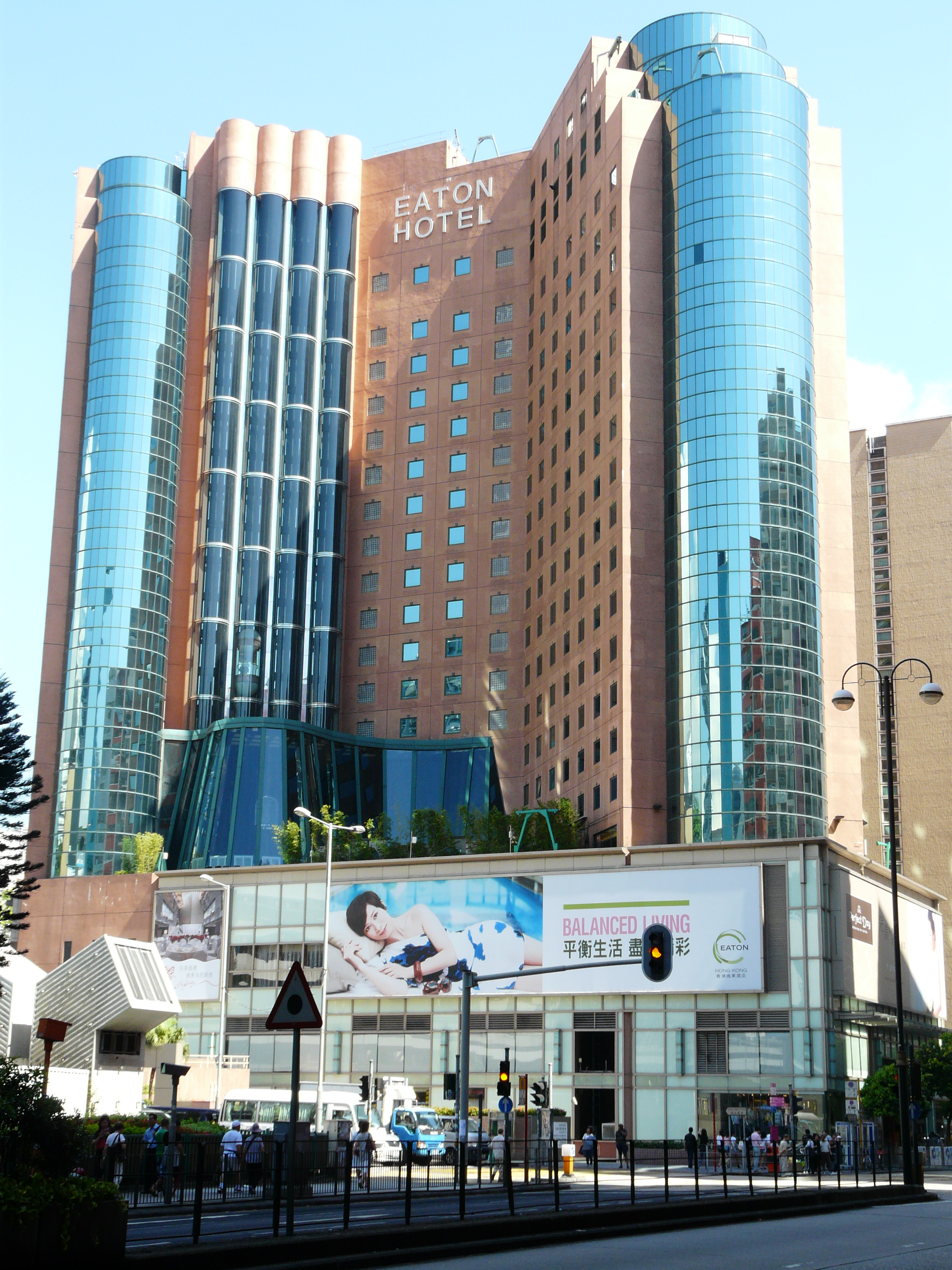
- Eaton HK
- Interactive map of the Eaton HK area

General information
- Location: 380 Nathan Road in Kowloon, Hong Kong
- Opened: 1 November 1990; 35 years ago
- Renovated: 2018; 8 years ago

Other information
- Number of rooms: 465 Rooms, 5 Suites

Eaton Hotel Hong Kong
- Traditional Chinese: 香港逸東酒店
- Simplified Chinese: 香港逸东酒店
Transcriptions
Standard Mandarin
- Hanyu Pinyin: Xiānggǎng Yìdōng Jiǔdiàn
Yue: Cantonese
- Jyutping: hoeng1 gong2 jat6 dung1 zau2 dim3

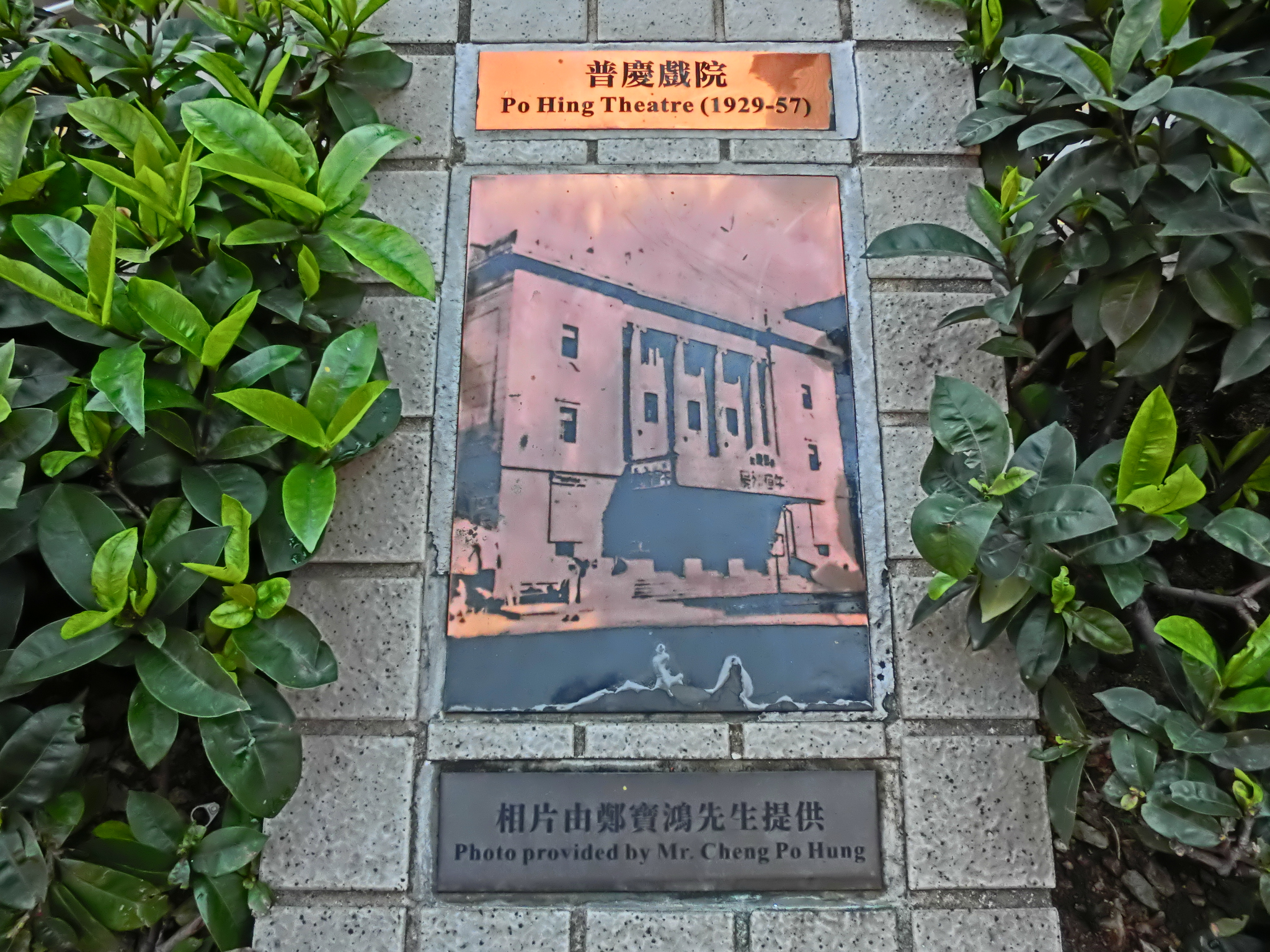
Plaque of the former Astor Theatre / Po Hing Theatre in front of the hotel.

Eaton HK (Chinese: 香港逸東酒店), owned by the Great Eagle Group, is a four-star hotel located at 380 Nathan Road in Kowloon, between Jordan and Yau Ma Tei, near the Temple Street Night Market and the Jade Market.

== History ==
The Eaton Hotel occupies the location of the former Astor Theatre / Po Hing Theatre (普慶戲院), Kowloon's first cinema. The tower hotel was built in the 1970s.

In the fall of 2018, Eaton Hong Kong was rebranded as Eaton HK, a hotel under Eaton Workshop (whose other property is Eaton DC). The hotel's design was overhauled by the US company AvroKO.

== Description ==
Eaton HK has 465 rooms in a range of configurations and sizes, from 172 to 603 sq ft (16–56 m^{2}). The hotel has three ballrooms/function rooms, ranging in size from 690 to 2,570 sq ft (64–239 m^{2}). It has the following restaurants: Yat Tung Heen, The Astor, Terrible Baby and the Eaton Food Hall. The hotel also includes an art gallery, “Tomorrow Maybe”.

Eaton Workshop is part of the portfolio of Hong Kong–based Great Eagle Holdings Ltd, which is also the parent company of the Langham Hospitality Group, both helmed by Chairman, Ka Shui Lo, the billionaire son of the late real estate tycoon Lo Ying-shek. The hotel is owned by Katherine Lo, who acquired the building from her father.

== Transportation ==
The hotel is a five-minute walk from Jordan station. Many buses also ply Nathan Road.
