= Pineapple & Pearls =

- Interactive map of Pineapple & Pearls

Restaurant information
- Established: 2016
- Owner: Aaron Silverman
- Food type: Contemporary
- Rating: (Michelin Guide)
- Location: 715 8th Street SE, Washington, D.C., 20003, United States
- Coordinates: 38°52′50.5″N 76°59′43.1″W
- Seating capacity: 70
- Website: www.pineappleandpearls.com

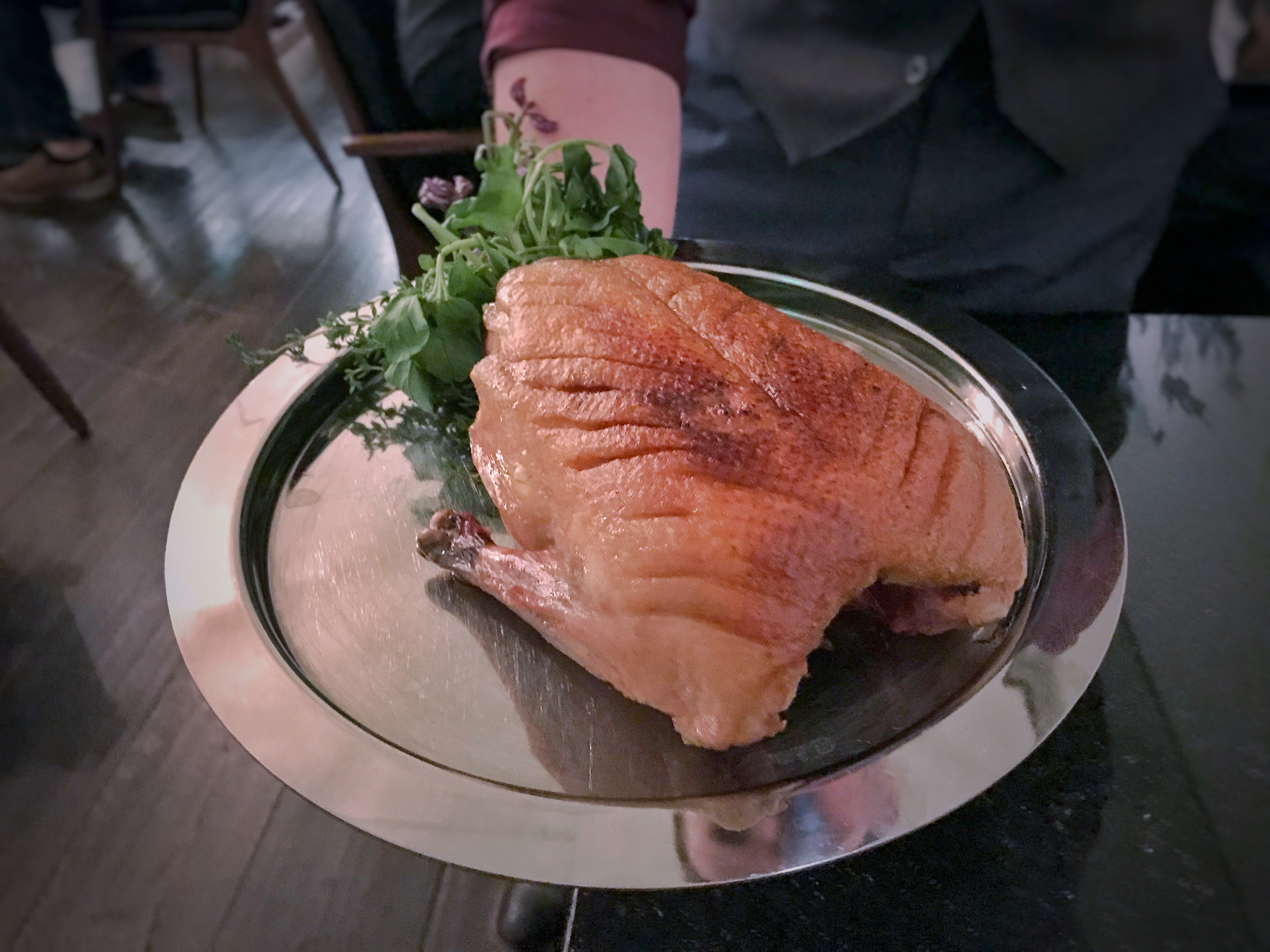
Whole roasted Alina duck at Pineapple & Pearls

Pineapple & Pearls is a restaurant located on Barracks Row in Washington, D.C., serving a fixed-price multi-course dinner. It opened in 2016. The Washington Post gave the restaurant a four-star review, writing that Aaron Silverman, the chef and owner, "...pushes the fine-dining cause in only exquisite directions." Pineapple & Pearls was a semifinalist in the Outstanding Restaurant category of the James Beard Foundation Awards in 2024.

The restaurant is next door to its sister restaurant, Rose's Luxury. A more casual daytime cafe operated in the front bar area of Pineapple & Pearls until December 2017, when the cafe, known as Little Pearl, opened its location a few blocks away.

== Awards ==
- 2016 Best New Restaurants, No.1, The Washington Post.
- 2017 Very Best Restaurants in Washington, No.1, Washingtonian (magazine).
- 2017 - 2023 Michelin Stars, the Michelin Guide.
- 2018 Five Diamond Rating, the American Automobile Association.
- 2020 - 2023 Michelin Star (Little Pearl), the Michelin Guide.

== See also ==
- List of Michelin-starred restaurants in Washington, D.C.
