= Reverie (restaurant) =

Restaurant in Washington, D.C., U.S.

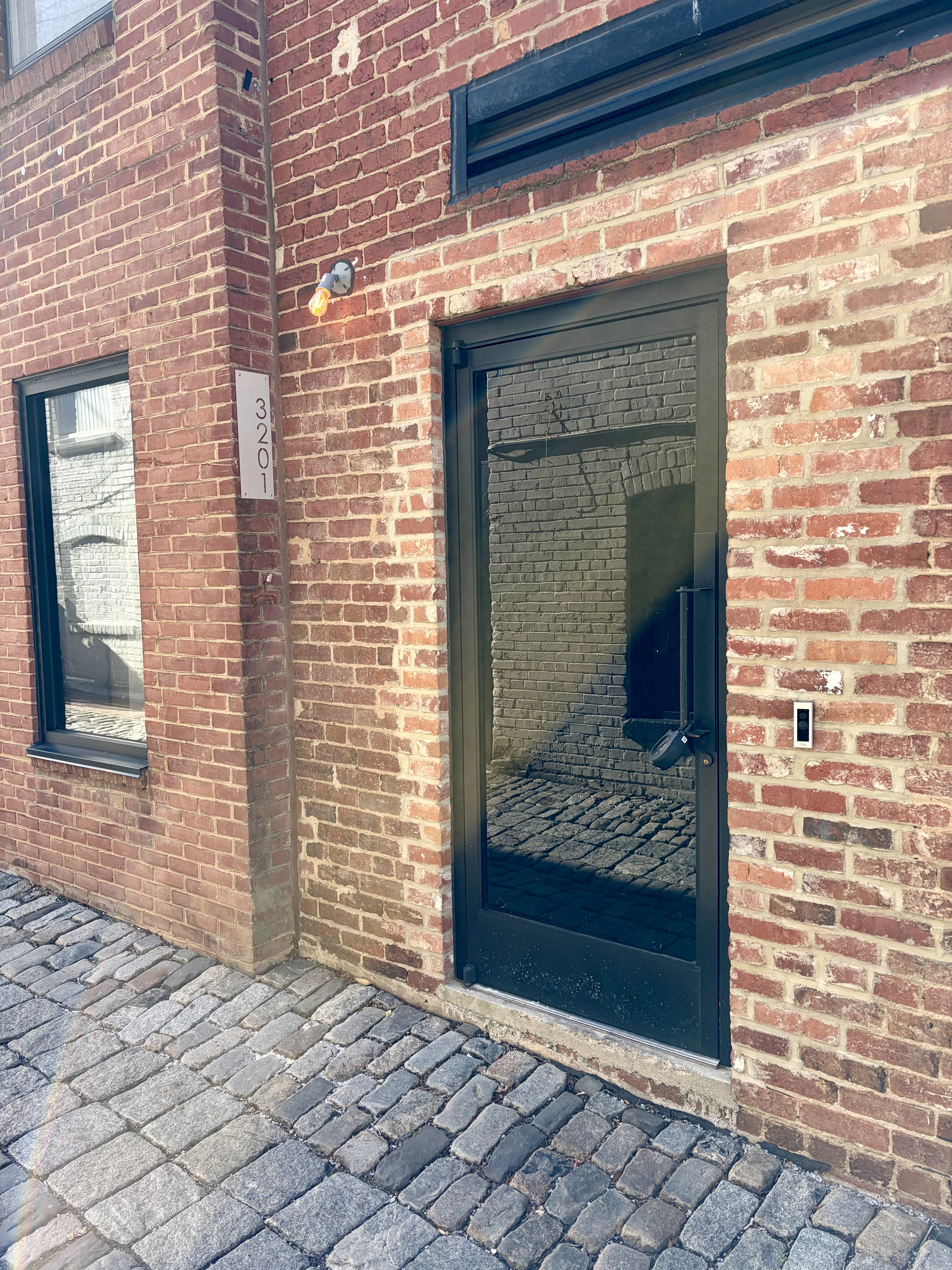
- The entrance of the closed Reverie space in 2025.
- Interactive map of Reverie

Restaurant information
- Established: October 6, 2018
- Closed: October 4, 2025
- Head chef: Johnny Spero
- Food type: American; New American
- Rating: (Michelin Guide)
- Location: 3201 Cherry Hill Lane NW, Washington, D.C., 20007, United States
- Coordinates: 38°54′13.5″N 77°3′48″W

Reverie was a restaurant serving American / New American cuisine in Washington, D.C.'s Georgetown neighborhood. The restaurant opened in 2018 and received a Michelin star prior to its closure in 2025.

== History ==
Reverie opened on October 6, 2018. It implemented a pay-what-you-can program for a limited number of patrons that December. The restaurant suffered fire damage in August 2022. Reverie closed on October 4, 2025.

== Reception ==
Reverie received a Michelin star in 2022. In 2019, Tom Sietsema rated the restaurant 2 out of 4 stars in a review published by The Washington Post.

== See also ==
- List of Michelin-starred restaurants in Washington, D.C.
- List of New American restaurants
