= Rania (restaurant) =

Indian restaurant in Washington, D.C., U.S.

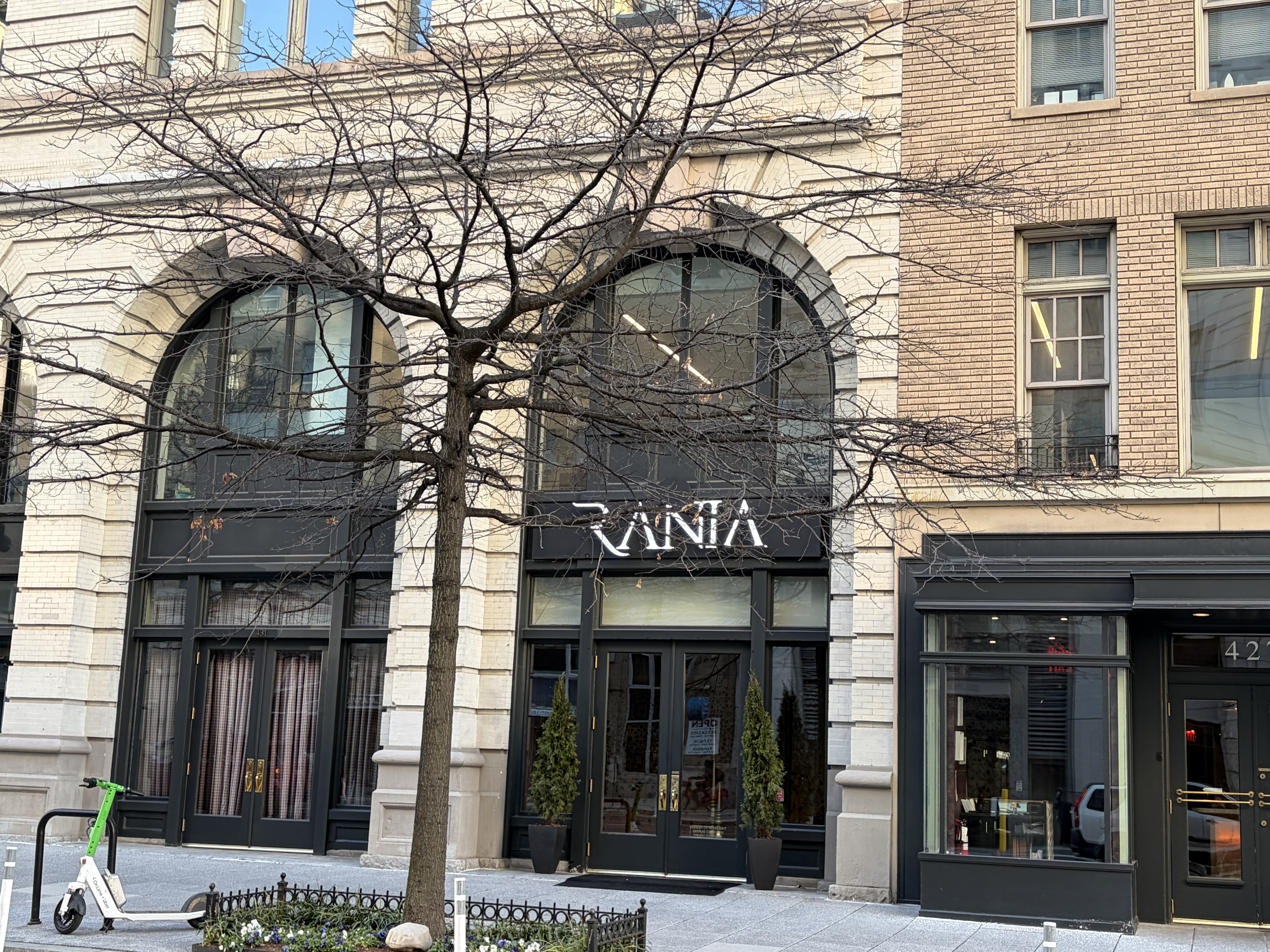
- Rania in January 2026
- Interactive map of Rania

Restaurant information
- Food type: Indian
- Location: 427 11th Street NW, Washington, D.C., 20004, United States
- Coordinates: 38°53′44″N 77°01′37″W

Rania is a restaurant in Penn Quarter, Washington, D.C., in the United States. The restaurant serves Indian cuisine and has received a Michelin star.

== See also ==
- List of Indian restaurants
- List of Michelin-starred restaurants in Washington, D.C.
