= Bresca (restaurant) =

Restaurant in Washington, D.C., U.S.

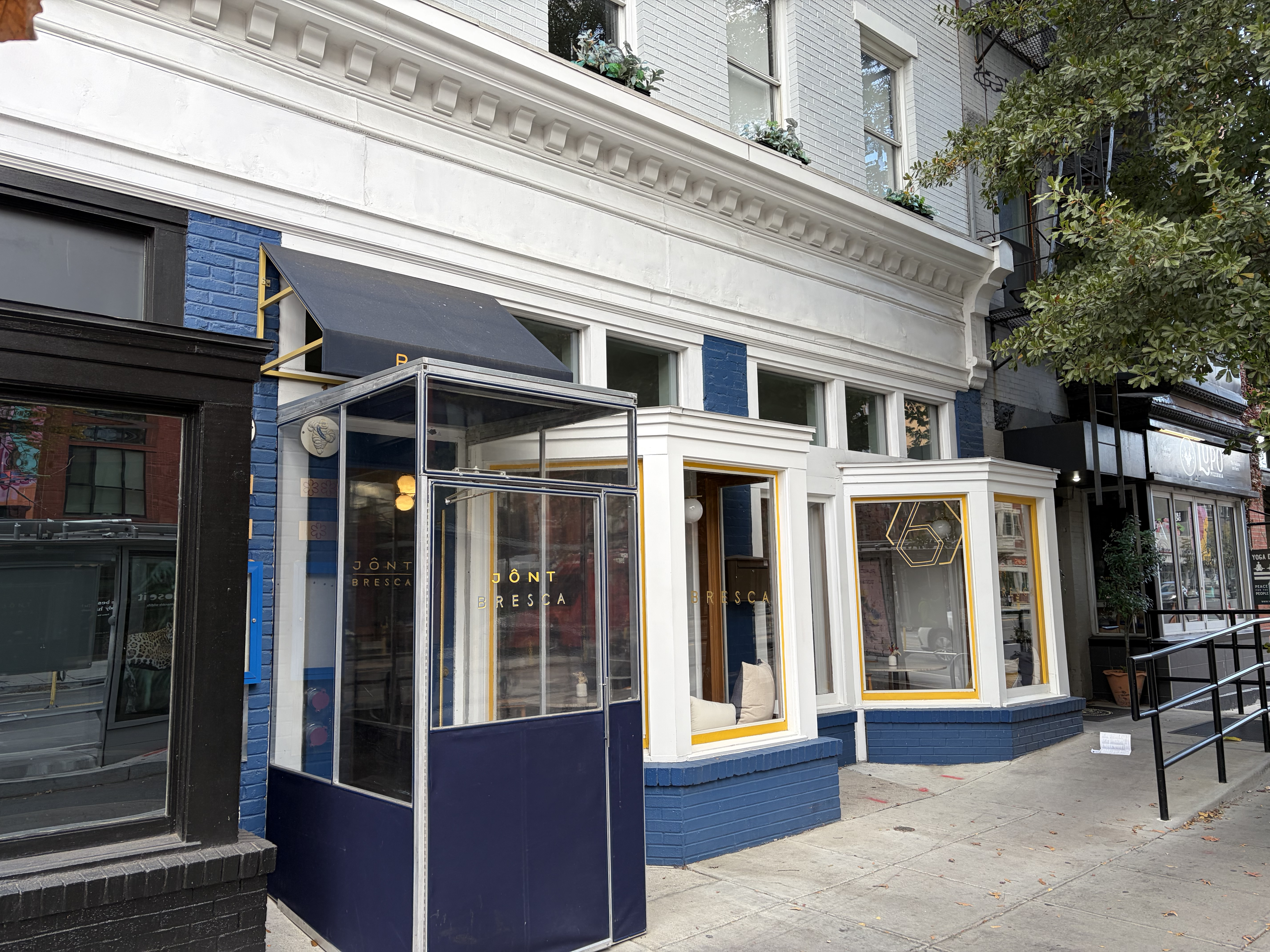
- Bresca in November 2025
- Interactive map of Bresca

Restaurant information
- Established: September 2017
- Food type: American
- Rating: (Michelin Guide)
- Location: 1906 14th Street NW, Washington, D.C., 20009, United States
- Coordinates: 38°54′57″N 77°1′56″W
- Website: brescadc.com

Bresca is a restaurant in Washington, D.C., United States. The restaurant serves American cuisine and has received a Michelin star.

== See also ==
- List of Michelin-starred restaurants in Washington, D.C.
