= The Inn at Little Washington =

Coordinates: 38.713473°N 78.159529°W

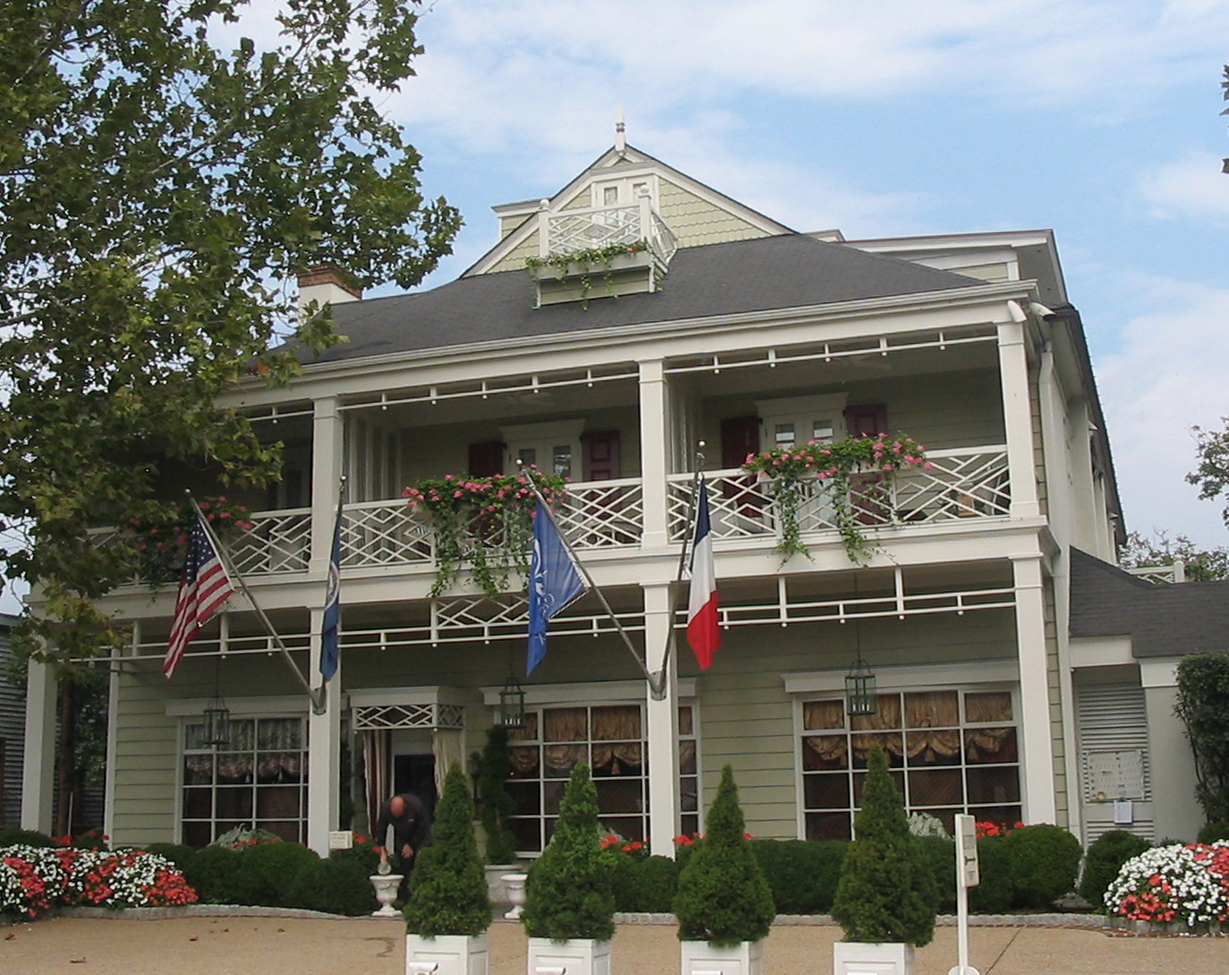
- Facade of the Inn at Little Washington
- Interactive map of The Inn at Little Washington

Restaurant information
- Established: 1978; 48 years ago
- Owner: Patrick O'Connell
- Food type: American
- Rating: (Michelin Guide) AAA Five Star Award (1988-2024): Fodor's Choice; Forbes Five Star Rated; Frommer's Exceptional
- Location: 309 Middle St, Washington, Rappahannock, Virginia, 22747, United States
- Reservations: Yes
- Website: www.theinnatlittlewashington.com

The Inn at Little Washington is a luxury country inn and restaurant located in Washington, Virginia. Patrick O'Connell and Reinhardt Lynch founded the Inn in a former garage in 1978. The property now includes more than 20 different properties and features a large main home, shops, gardens, and a small animal farm.

It has been a member of the Relais & Châteaux hotel group since 1987, and is the only restaurant listed in the Michelin Guide for Washington, D.C. that is not located within the city limits.

== History ==
Reinhardt Lynch and Patrick O'Connell opened The Inn at Little Washington in 1978. Located in Washington, Virginia, about an hour and a half drive from Washington, D.C., the building was an auto repair shop before Reinhardt and O'Connell converted the front half into a dining room.

Architect Albert Hinckley was hired to restore the building, and the London-based designer Joyce Conwy Evans decorated the interior.

The Inn at Little Washington has grown over the years and now includes more than 20 different properties, including a 6,000-square-foot home, various shops, gardens, and a farm filled with sheep, chickens, and llamas.

== Awards and honors ==
The Inn has been featured in several national and international newspapers, including The Washington Post and The New York Times. It was the first establishment to receive five stars for both its accommodations and its cuisine in the Mobil Travel Guide, a distinction that remains unchallenged. The Inn repeated this feat by becoming the first restaurant/inn to receive five diamonds from the AAA for its food and accommodations in 1989; the Inn and restaurant maintained that distinction through 2016. In 2018, the Inn received a coveted three-star rating from the Michelin Guide. The restaurant held that rating until 2025, when it was downgraded to two stars. The restaurant received five James Beard Foundation awards, including Best Service, Best Wine List, Restaurant of the Year, Best Chef in the Mid–Atlantic, and Chef of the Year.

The International Herald Tribune rated it as one of the Top Ten Best Restaurants in the World. The Zagat Survey for Washington, D.C. rated it number one in all categories for fourteen consecutive years. Travel & Leisure Magazine has ranked the Inn as the number one hotel in the world for food, number eight in the world, and number two in North America overall. The restaurant has been awarded Wine Spectator's "Grand Award" for the last twelve years. Other distinctions include Cigar Aficionado's "Grand Cru" award for the restaurant's wine list, and the "Reader's Top Table" award in Gourmet's Restaurant Issue.

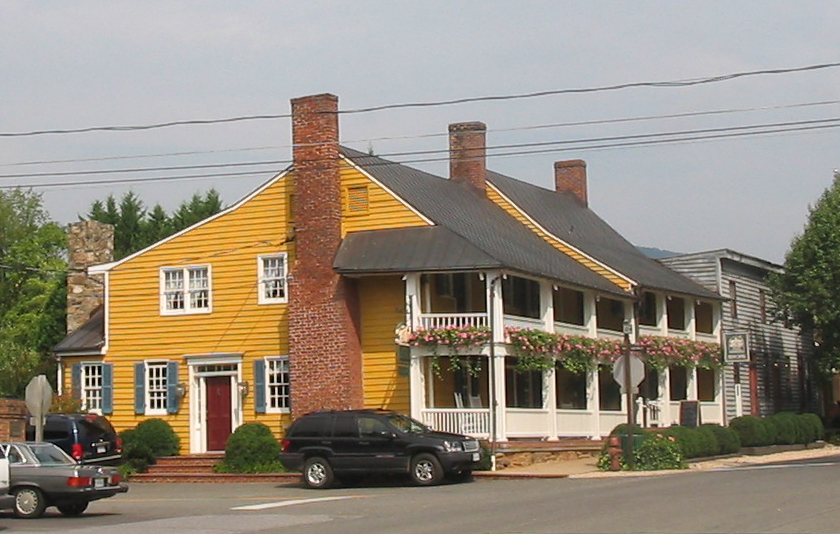
Specialty shop owned and operated by the Inn

Andrew Lloyd Webber once claimed, "For my money this little hotel provides the best overall dining experience I can remember in a long while, perhaps my best ever."

The Inn's history was described in a 2010 article, stating that the Inn's staff "discreetly tries to detect and record the emotional state of each person in a dinner party on a scale of 1 to 10. Their goal is to get you up to at least a "9" before the long drive home. This simple rating system allows the staff at The Inn to make very subtle adjustments to service throughout the night—so that even someone who arrives for dinner in a serious funk will likely wind up walking on country air before the night is through."

== See also ==
- List of Michelin 3-star restaurants
- List of Michelin 3-star restaurants in the United States
- List of Michelin-starred restaurants in Washington, D.C.
