= Tail Up Goat =

Restaurant in Washington, D.C., U.S.

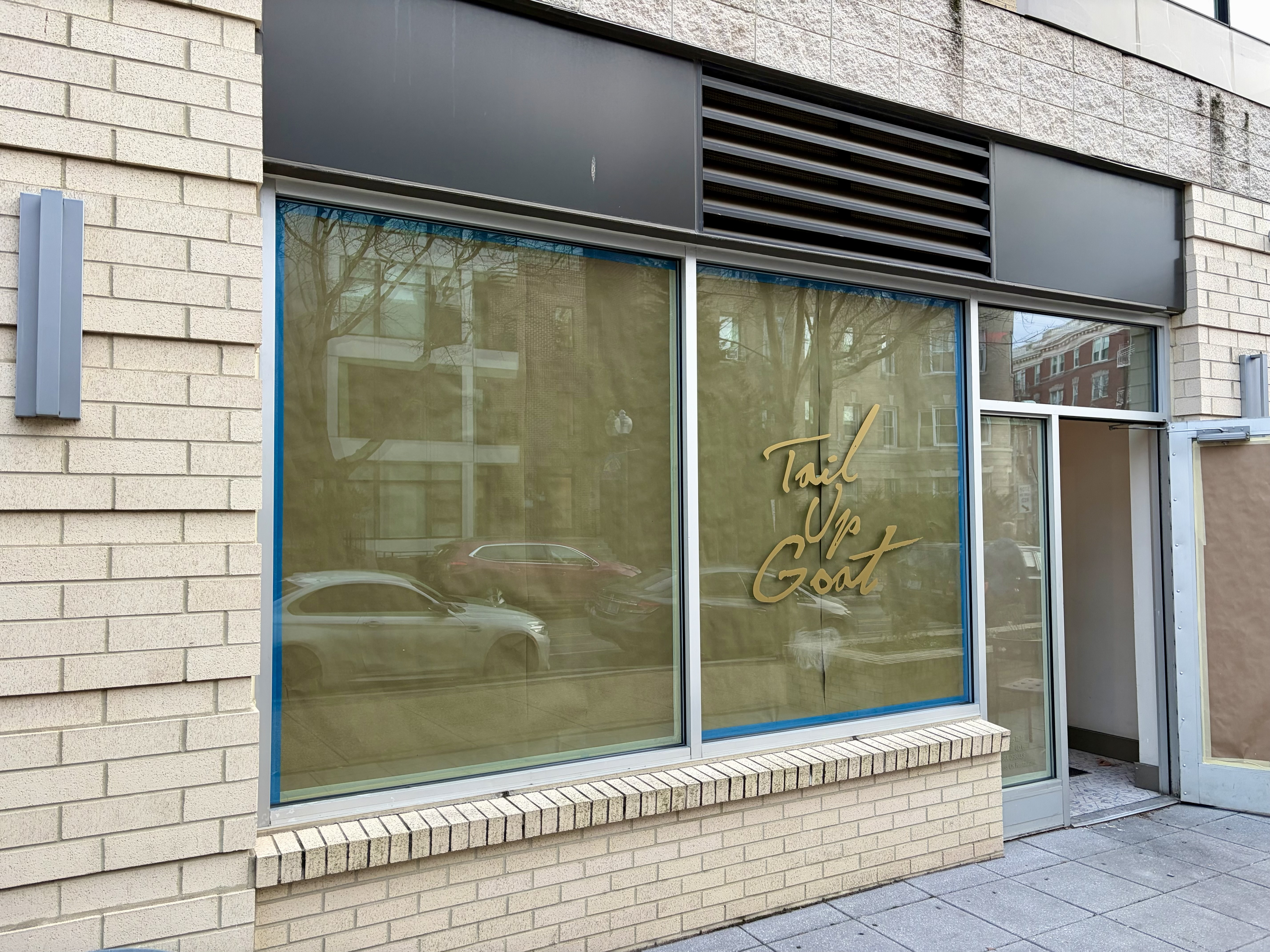
- Tail Up Goat's location pictured in January 2026 after its closure
- Interactive map of Tail Up Goat

Restaurant information
- Established: 2016
- Closed: December 20, 2025
- Head chef: Jon Sybert
- Food type: Mediterranean
- Rating: (Michelin Guide)
- Location: 1827 Adams Mill Road NW, Washington, D.C., 20009, United States
- Coordinates: 38°55′25″N 77°2′35.3″W
- Website: tailupgoat.com

Tail Up Goat was a Mediterranean restaurant in Adams Morgan, Washington, D.C. The restaurant opened in 2016 and received a Michelin star. The restaurant closed on December 20, 2025, which owners Jon Sybert and Jill Tyler attributed to a lack of financial sustainability for the restaurant's business model. They planned to open a new restaurant, Rye Bunny, with lower operating costs in the same location in 2026.

== Reception ==
The restaurant has received a Michelin star. Frommer's rates the business 3 out of 3 stars. In 2016, Ann Limpert of Washingtonian magazine rated Tail Up Goat 3 out of 4 stars.

== See also ==
- List of Michelin starred restaurants in Washington, D.C.
