= Mita (restaurant) =

Latin American restaurant in Washington, D.C., U.S.

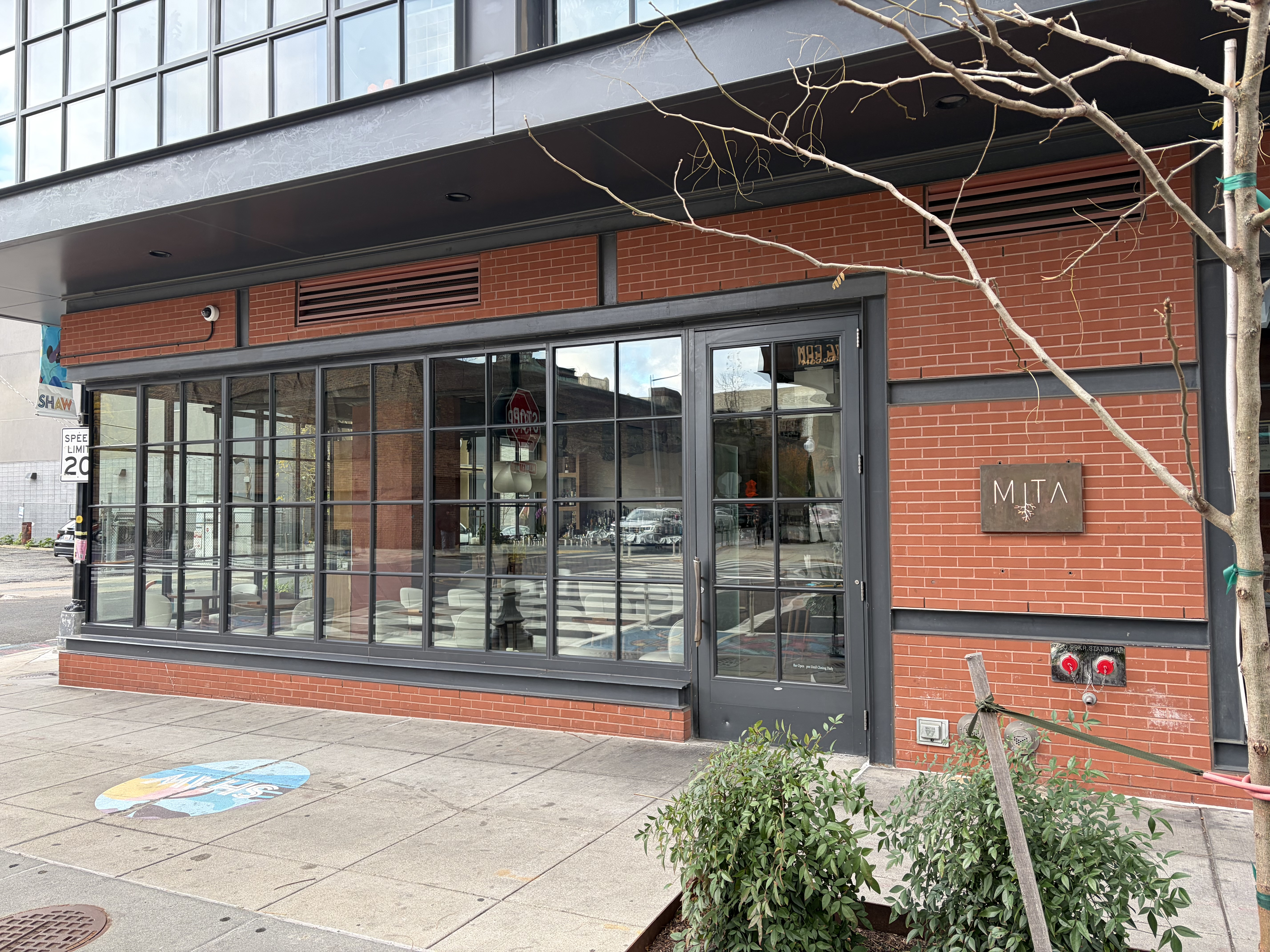
- The restaurant's exterior in November 2025
- Interactive map of Mita

Restaurant information
- Established: December 2023
- Owners: Miguel Guerra and Tatiana Mora
- Head chef: Miguel Guerra and Tatiana Mora
- Food type: Plant-based Latin American
- Rating: (Michelin Guide)
- Location: 804 V Street NW, Washington, D.C., 20001, United States
- Coordinates: 38°55′04″N 77°01′24″W
- Website: mitadc.com

Mita is a Michelin-starred plant-based Latin American restaurant in Washington, D.C., United States.

== See also ==
- List of Michelin-starred restaurants in Washington, D.C.
