= Gravitas (restaurant) =

Restaurant in Washington, D.C., U.S.

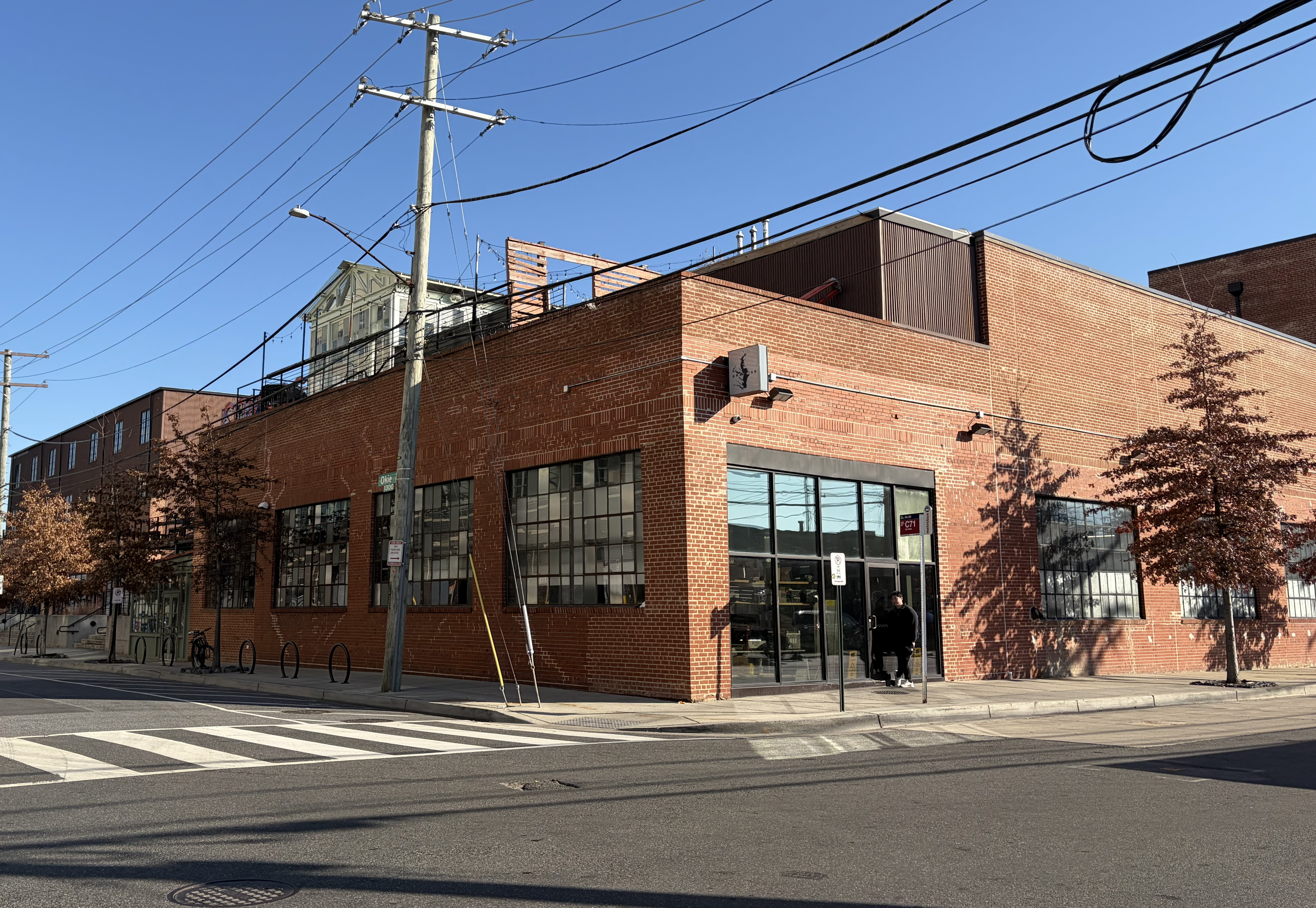
- Gravitas in 2025
- Interactive map of Gravitas

Restaurant information
- Established: July 1, 2018
- Owner: Matt Baker
- Chef: Matt Baker
- Food type: American
- Dress code: Casual
- Rating: (Michelin Guide)
- Location: 1401 Okie Street NE, Washington, D.C., 20002, United States
- Coordinates: 38°54′52″N 76°59′3″W
- Website: www.gravitasdc.com

Gravitas was a restaurant in the Ivy City neighborhood of Northeast Washington, D.C., United States. The restaurant was opened by chef Matt Baker on July 1, 2018. It was his first restaurant. It served American cuisine and received a Michelin star in 2019.

On January 22, 2026, the D.C. Office of Tax and Revenue seized and closed Gravitas, along with Michele's, another of Baker's restaurants, due to hundreds of thousands of dollars in unpaid sales taxes. Baker said he was working with the city to resolve the tax liens and reopen both restaurants.

== See also ==
- List of defunct restaurants of the United States
- List of Michelin-starred restaurants in Washington, D.C.
