= Rose's Luxury =

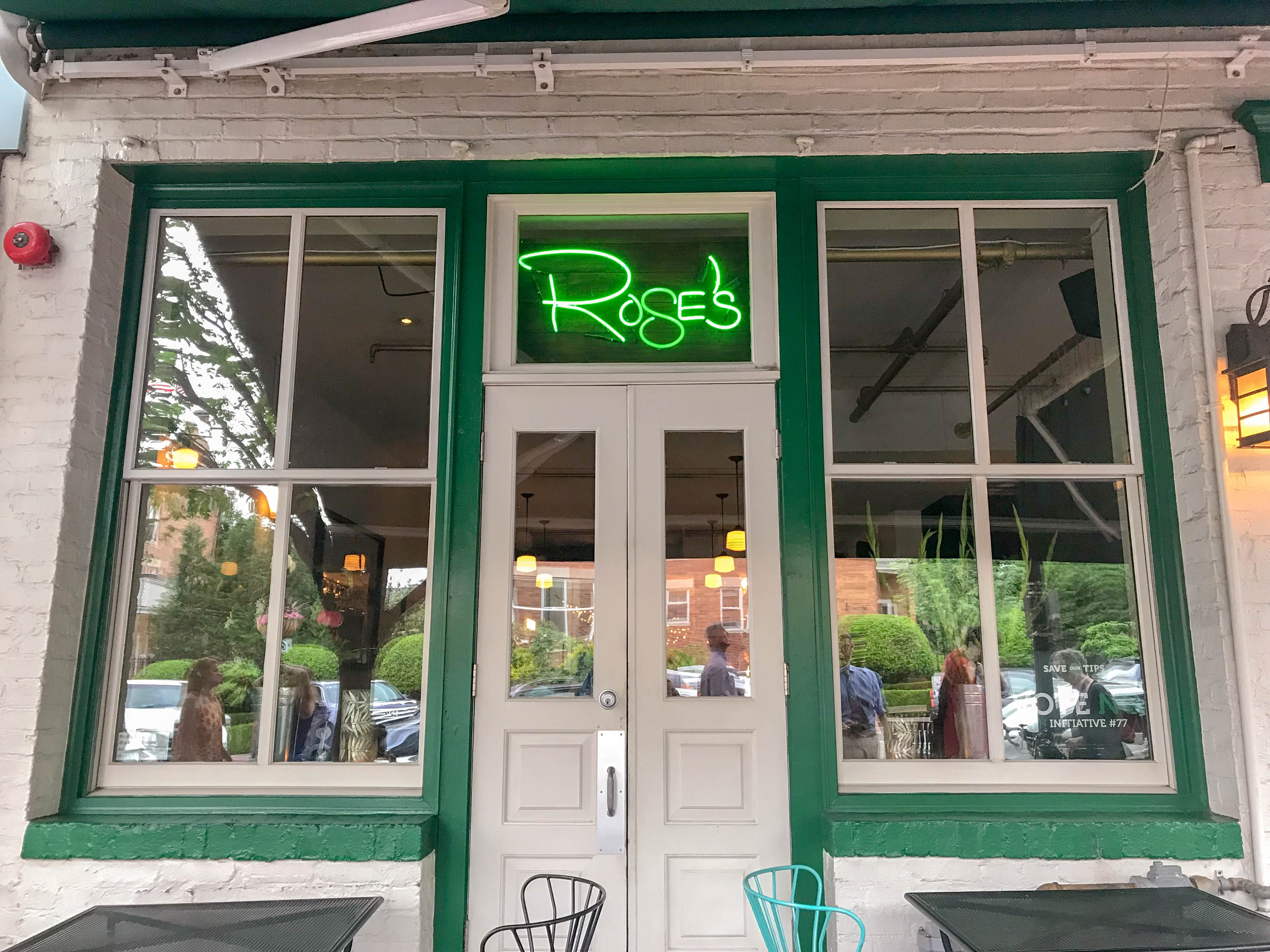
- Front entrance of Rose's Luxury

- Location within Washington, D.C.

Restaurant information
- Established: 2013; 13 years ago
- Owner: Aaron Silverman
- Head chef: Aaron Silverman
- Food type: Contemporary
- Rating: (Michelin Guide)
- Location: 717 8th St SE, Washington, D.C., 20003, United States
- Coordinates: 38°52′50″N 76°59′43″W
- Seating capacity: 90
- Reservations: Yes
- Website: www.rosesluxury.com

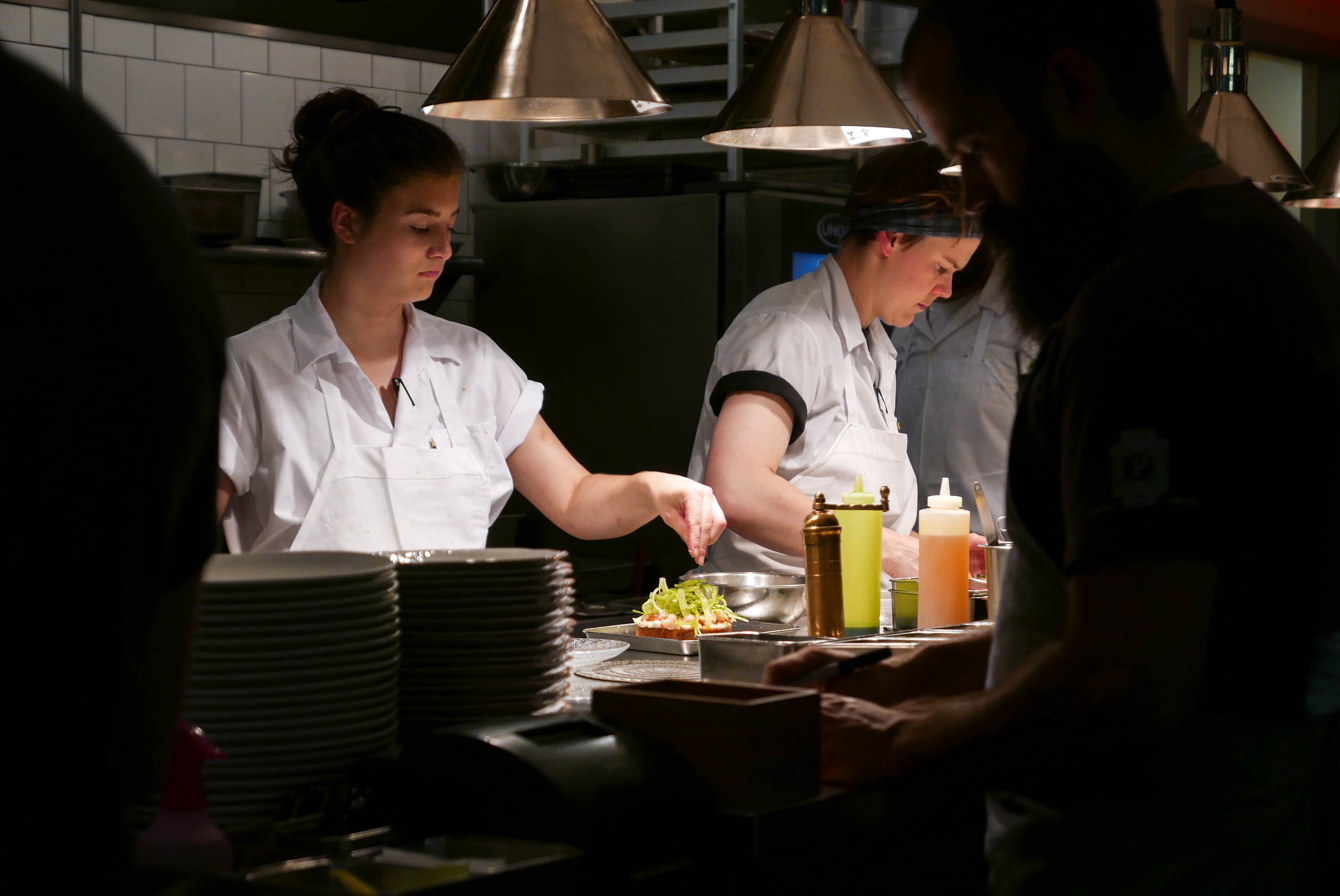
Chefs at work in the open kitchen

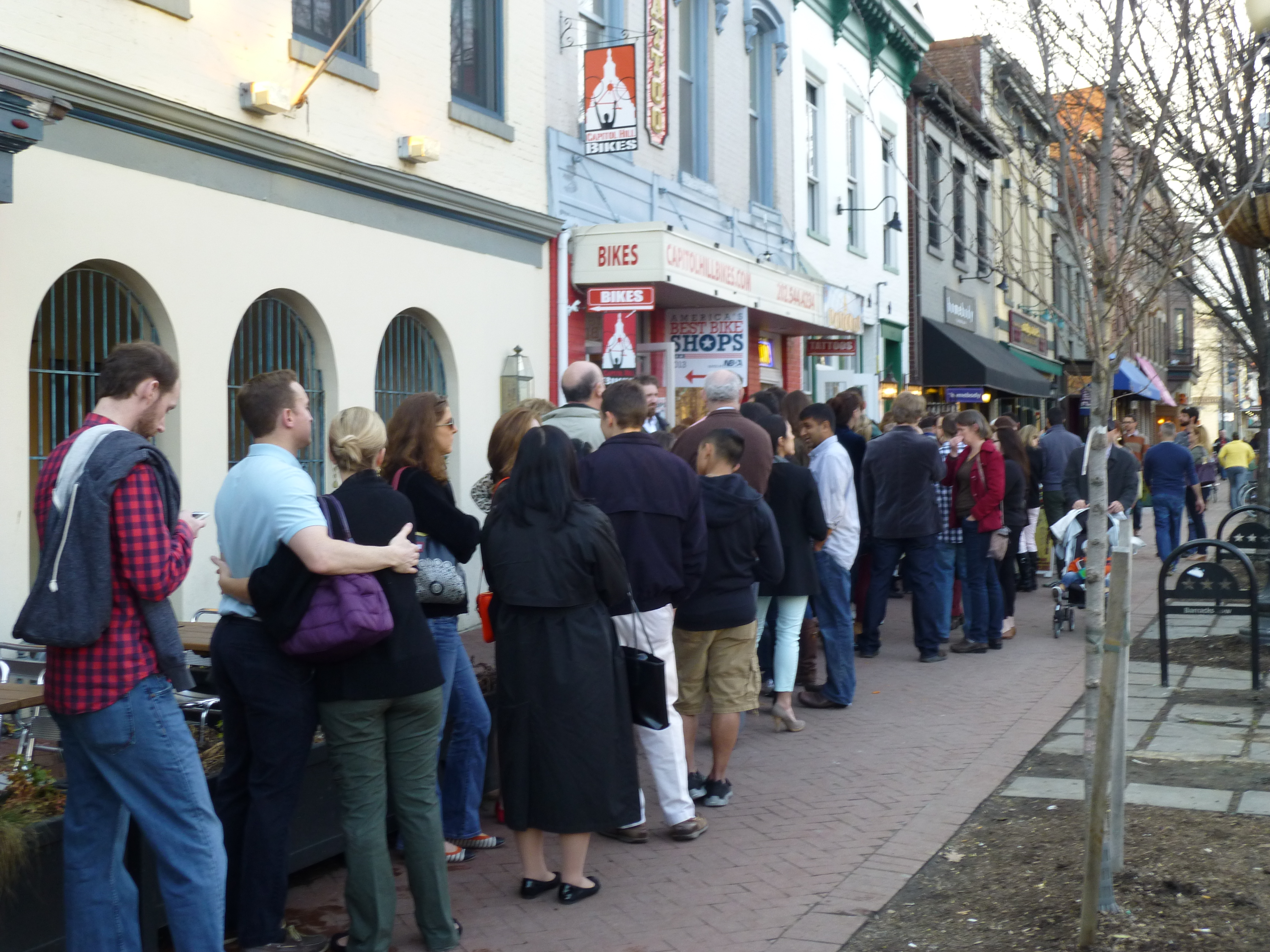
Patrons lined up to get into the restaurant

Rose's Luxury is a restaurant on Barracks Row in Washington, D.C., created by chef-owner Aaron Silverman. It is known for not taking reservations which creates long lines, such that a nearby bar's top cocktail is called 'Waiting for Rose's' and line waiters are reported to make up to thirty dollars an hour waiting in line. President Barack Obama celebrated his 54th birthday at Rose's after First Lady Michelle Obama previously ate at the restaurant. The opening of Rose's Luxury in 2013 was the subject of a documentary, New Chefs on the Block. Chef Aaron Silverman had prior experience at Momofuku. It opened a fine dining restaurant next door to Rose's Luxury named Pineapple & Pearls in 2016. Silverman has been the subject of a profile in The Washington Post, which characterized his work as mastery of 'the art of serious play'.

== Menu ==
Menu items

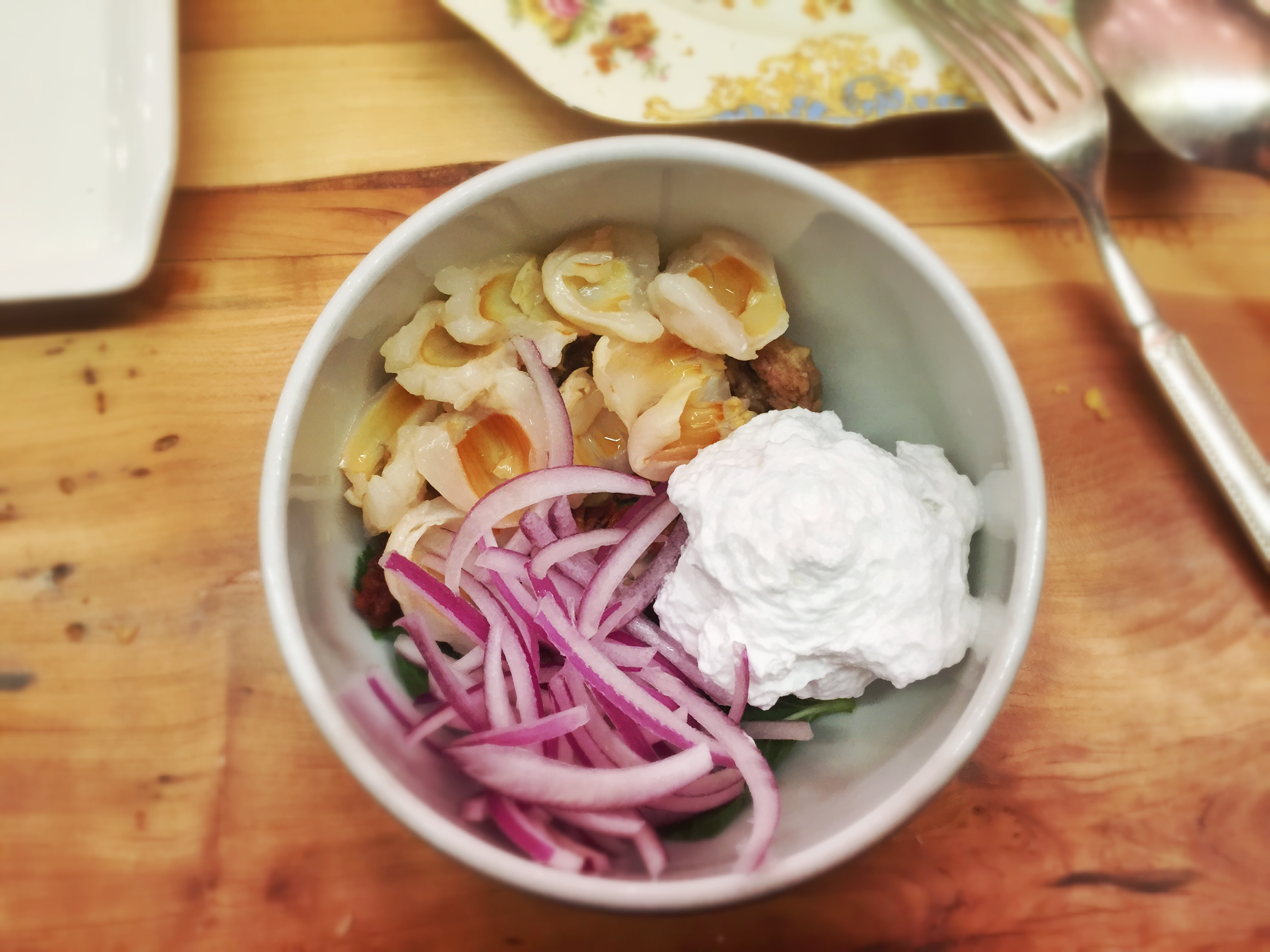
Lychee salad, coconut cream, pork sausage

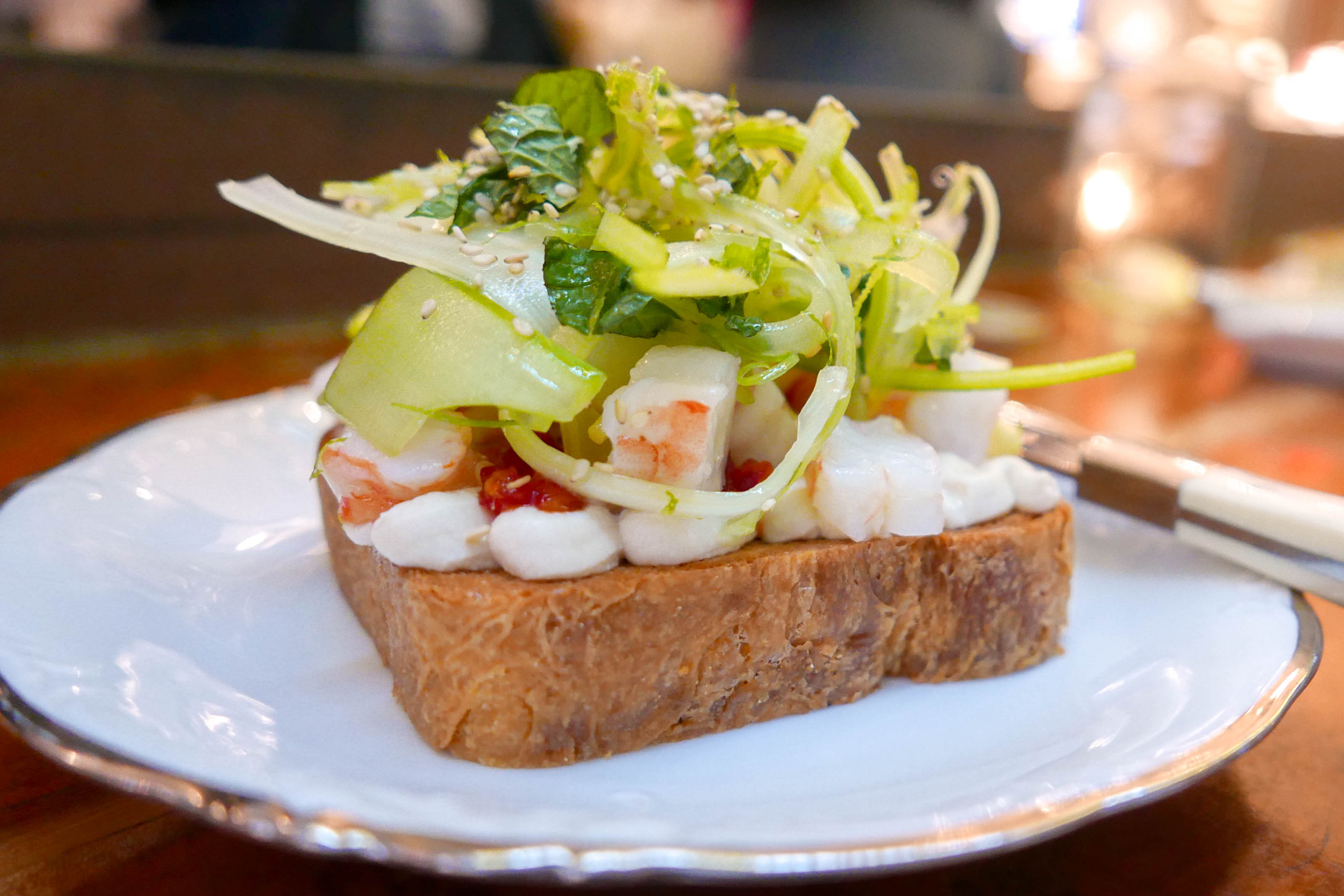
Shrimp toast

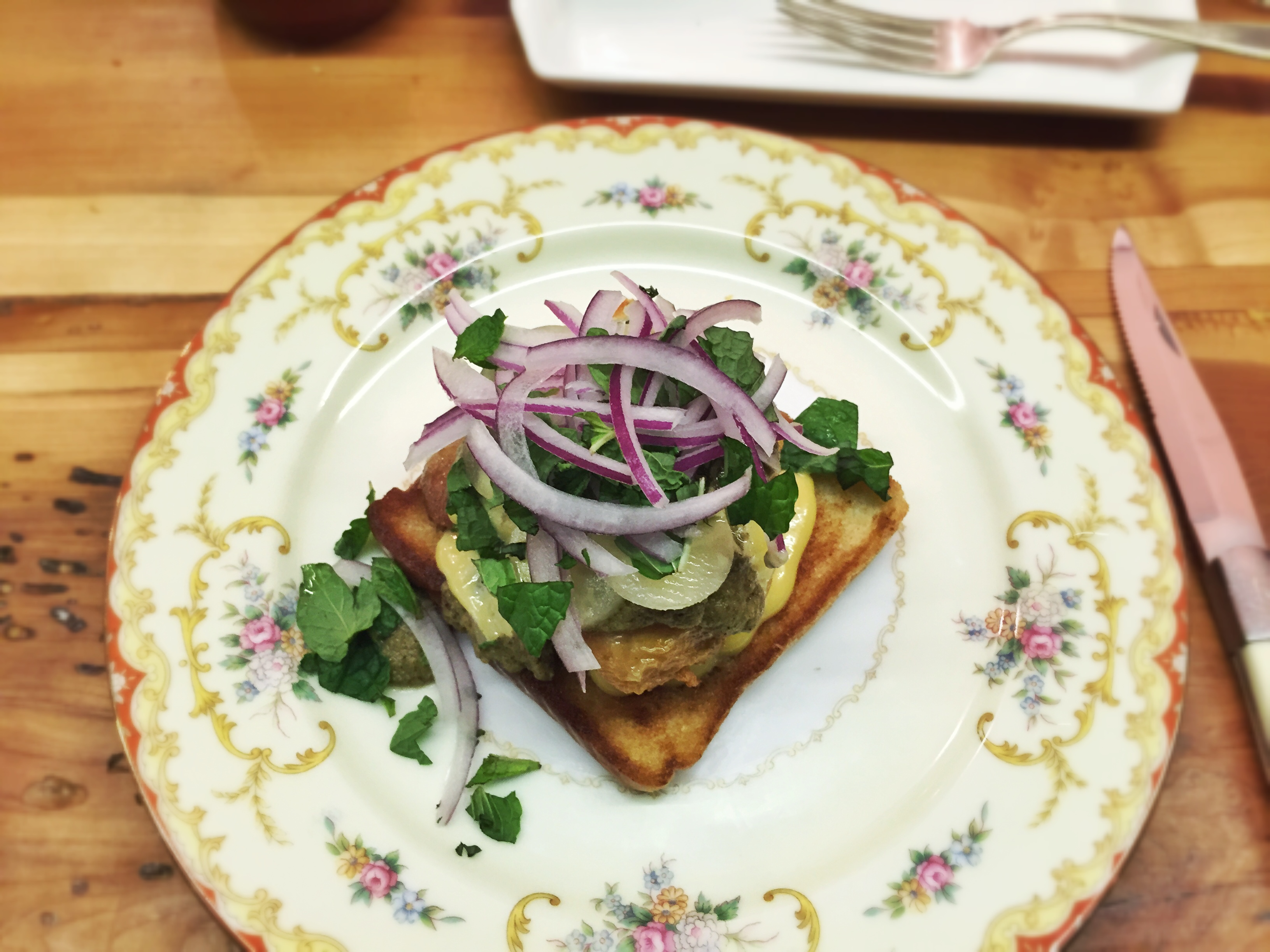
Hot chicken

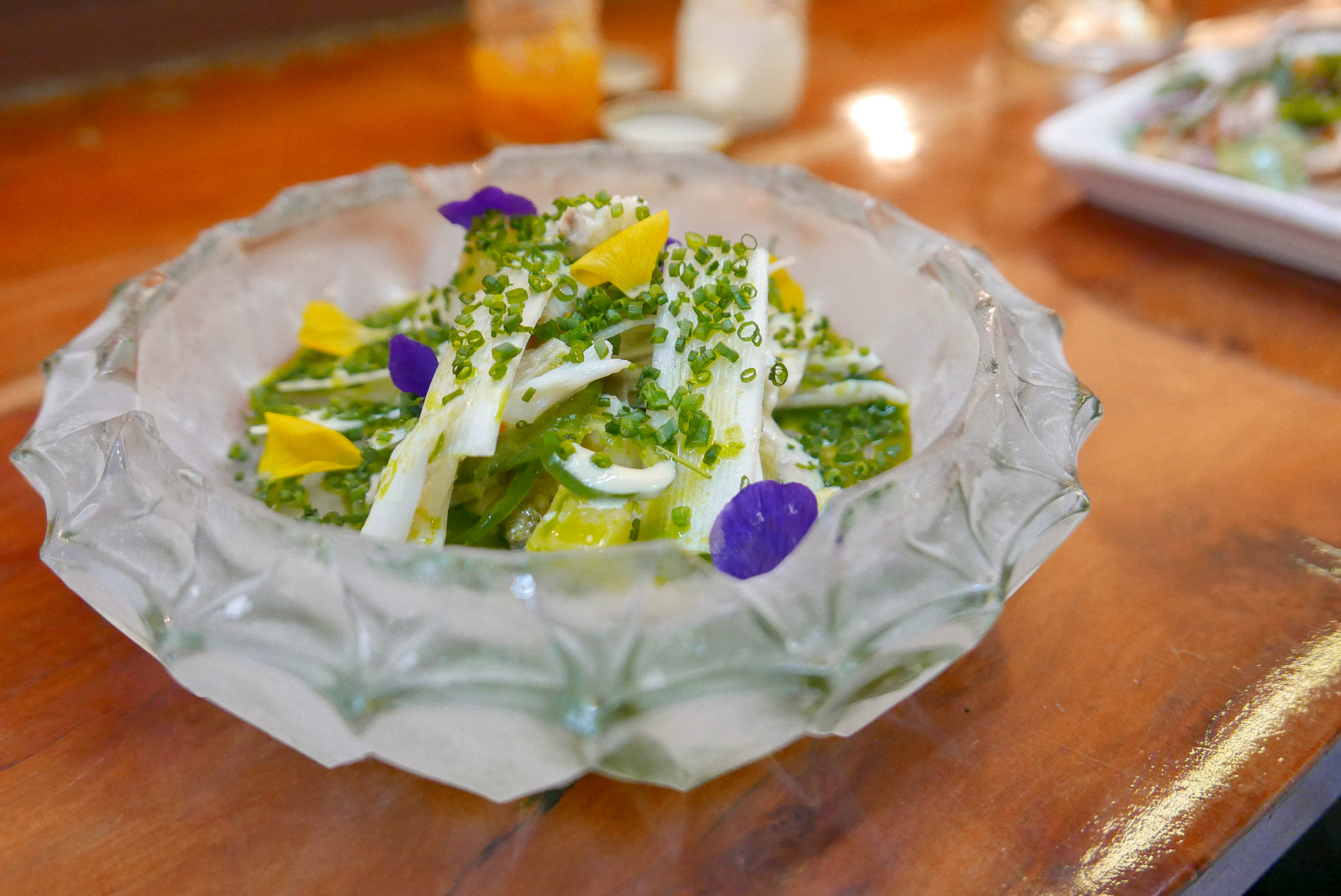
Crab Louis Salad

== Awards ==
- 2014 Best New Restaurant in America, Bon Appétit.
- 2015 Most Outstanding Restaurants, No.1, GQ.
- 2015 Top Ten Restaurants, No.1, The Washington Post.
- 2016 Best Restaurants in America, Hall of Fame, Eater.
- 2017 Michelin Star, the Michelin Guide.
- 2018 Michelin Star, the Michelin Guide.
- 2019 Michelin Star, the Michelin Guide.
- 2020 Michelin Star, the Michelin Guide.
- 2021 Michelin Star, the Michelin Guide.
- 2022 Michelin Star, the Michelin Guide.

== See also ==
- List of Michelin starred restaurants in Washington, D.C.
