= Rooster & Owl =

Restaurant in Washington, D.C., U.S.

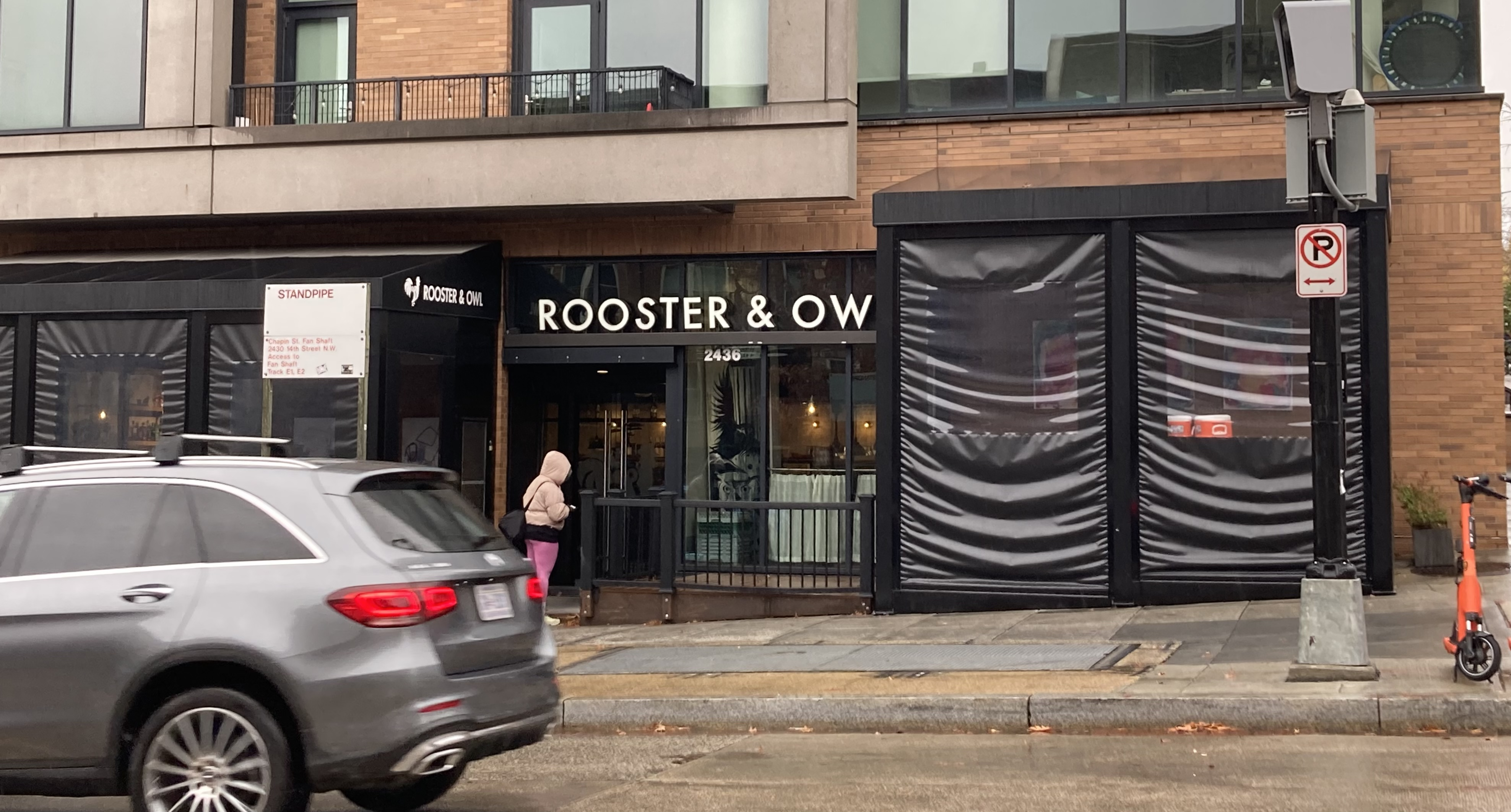
- The restaurant's exterior in 2024
- Interactive map of Rooster & Owl

Restaurant information
- Established: February 7, 2019
- Owners: Carey Tang; Yuan Tang
- Manager: Carey Tang
- Food type: American
- Rating: (Michelin Guide)
- Location: 2436 14th Street NW, Washington, D.C., 20009, United States
- Coordinates: 38°55′17.3″N 77°1′55.7″W
- Website: roosterowl.com

Rooster & Owl is a restaurant in the Columbia Heights neighborhood of Washington, D.C., United States, that focuses on American cuisine. The restaurant opened in 2019, and has had one Michelin star since 2021.

== Description ==
Rooster & Owl is an American restaurant on 14th Street NW in Washington, D.C. The menu has included tzatziki salad with honeydew and Calabrian chili, banh mi with foie gras and Nueske's bacon, "cacio-e-elote" with corn and queso fresco, goat cheesecake, burrata, cornbread, panzanella, tabouleh, and a variant of a Caesar salad with Brussels sprouts and cheddar cheese.

== History ==
Rooster & Owl opened on February 7, 2019. It is the debut restaurant of married owners Carey and Yuan Tang, who later opened Ellie Bird.

== Reception ==
Rooster & Owl has received a Michelin star. It was included in the Washingtonian's 2023 list of the city's 100 "very best" restaurants.

== See also ==
- List of Michelin-starred restaurants in Washington, D.C.
