= Sushi Taro =

Japanese restaurant in Washington, D.C., U.S.

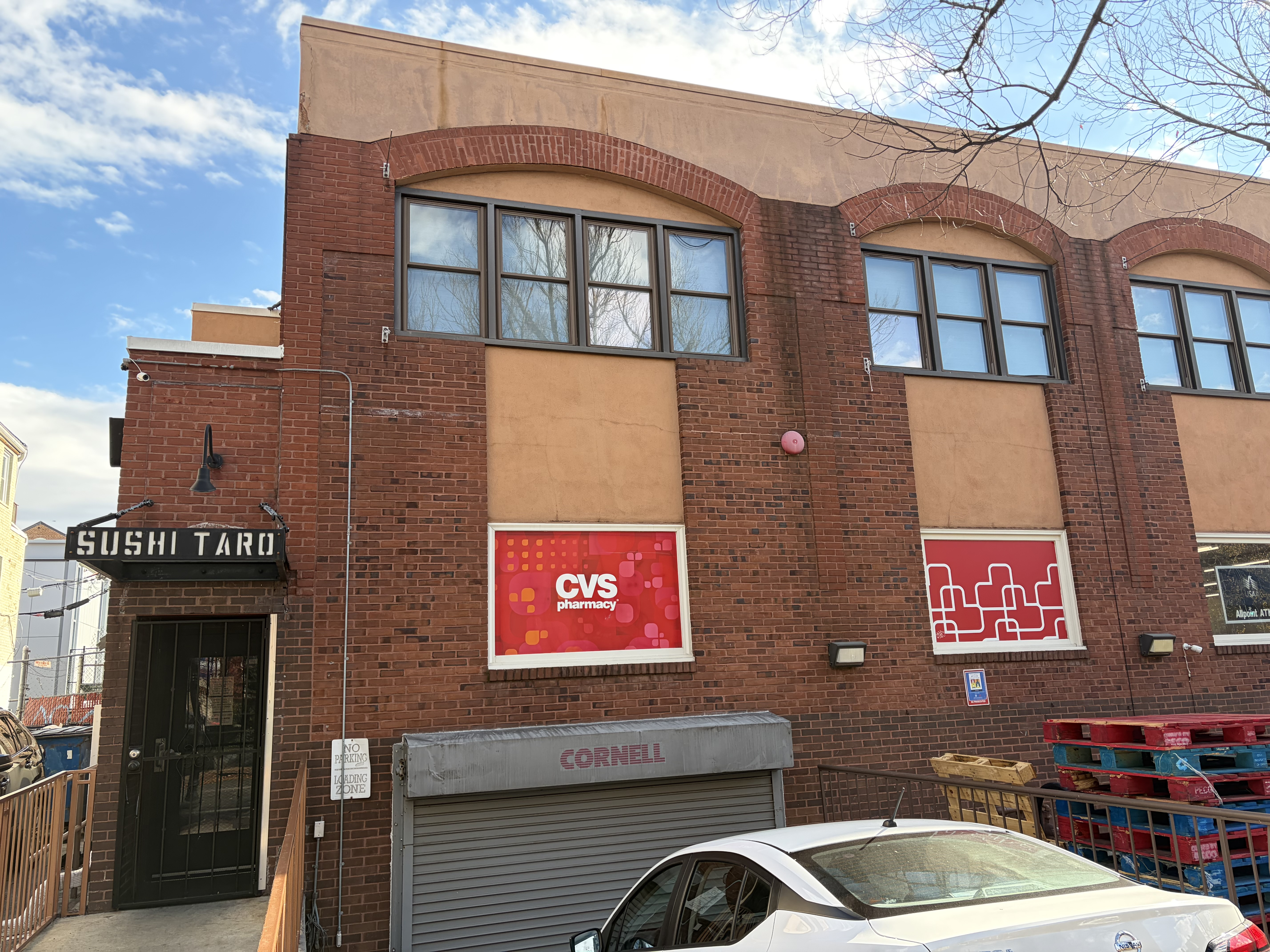
- The entrance of Sushi Taro (on the left), with the restaurant above the CVS location.
- Interactive map of Sushi Taro

Restaurant information
- Food type: Japanese
- Location: 1503 17th St NW, Washington, D.C., 20036, United States
- Coordinates: 38°54′35.8″N 77°2′17.8″W
- Website: sushitaro.com

Sushi Taro is a Japanese restaurant in Washington, D.C., United States. The restaurant specializes in sushi, and has received a Michelin star.

== Description ==
Sushi Taro operates above a CVS Pharmacy store at 17th and P St NW in Dupont Circle.

== History ==
Nobu Yamazaki is the owner, and Masa Kitayama is the chef de cuisine.

== See also ==
- List of Japanese restaurants
- List of Michelin starred restaurants in Washington, D.C.
- List of sushi restaurants
