= Eaton DC =

Hotel in Washington, D.C.

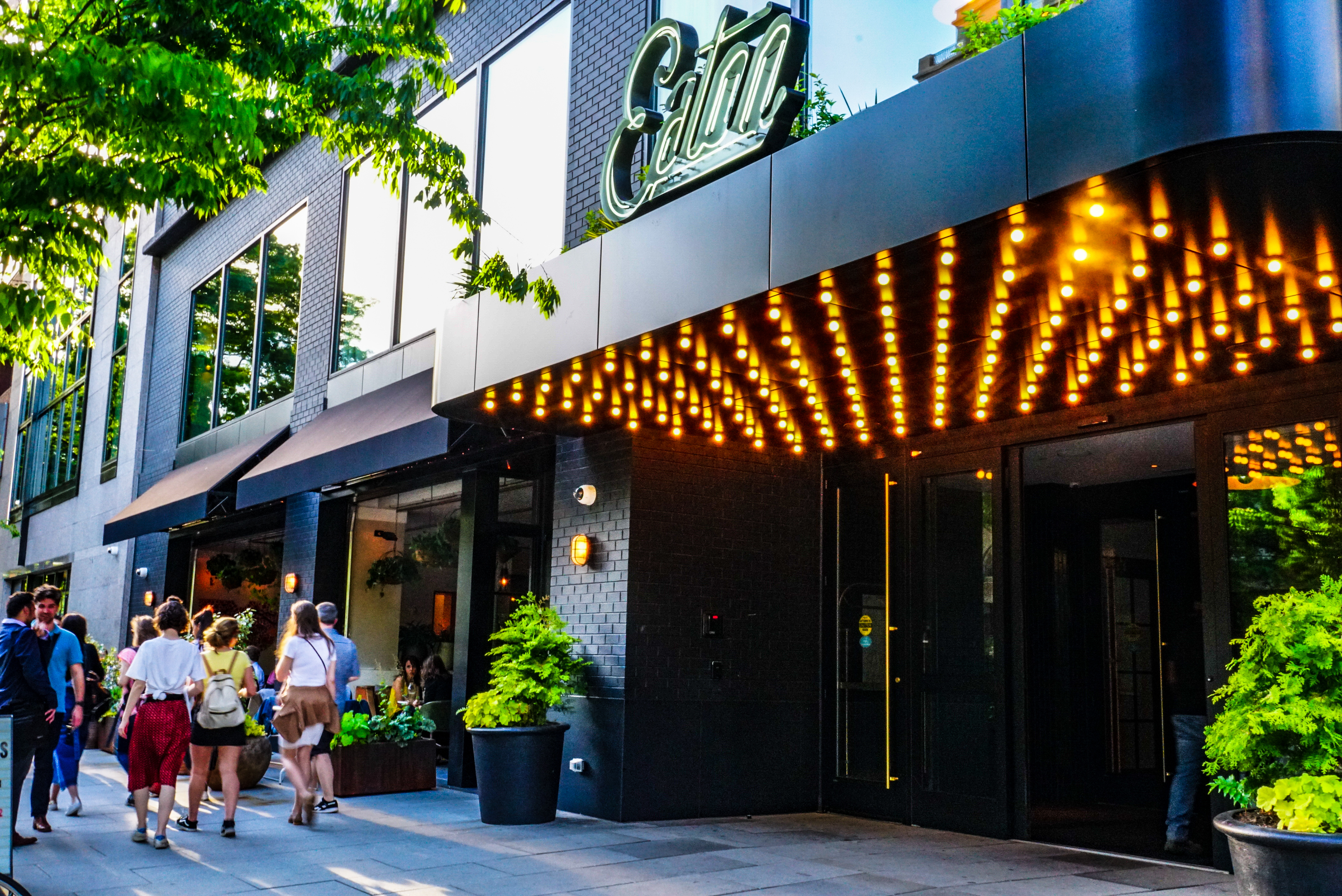
Entrance to the hotel on K Street

Eaton DC is a hotel in Washington, D.C. It is the flagship property of the Eaton Workshop group (whose other member is Eaton HK), and has branding designed to appeal to a liberal clientele. It was founded by Katherine Lo, the daughter of Lo Ka Shui, the chairman of Great Eagle Holdings. It opened on September 29, 2018, and includes two bars, a wellness center, and a coworking space.
