= Patrick O'Connell (chef) =

American chef (born 1945)

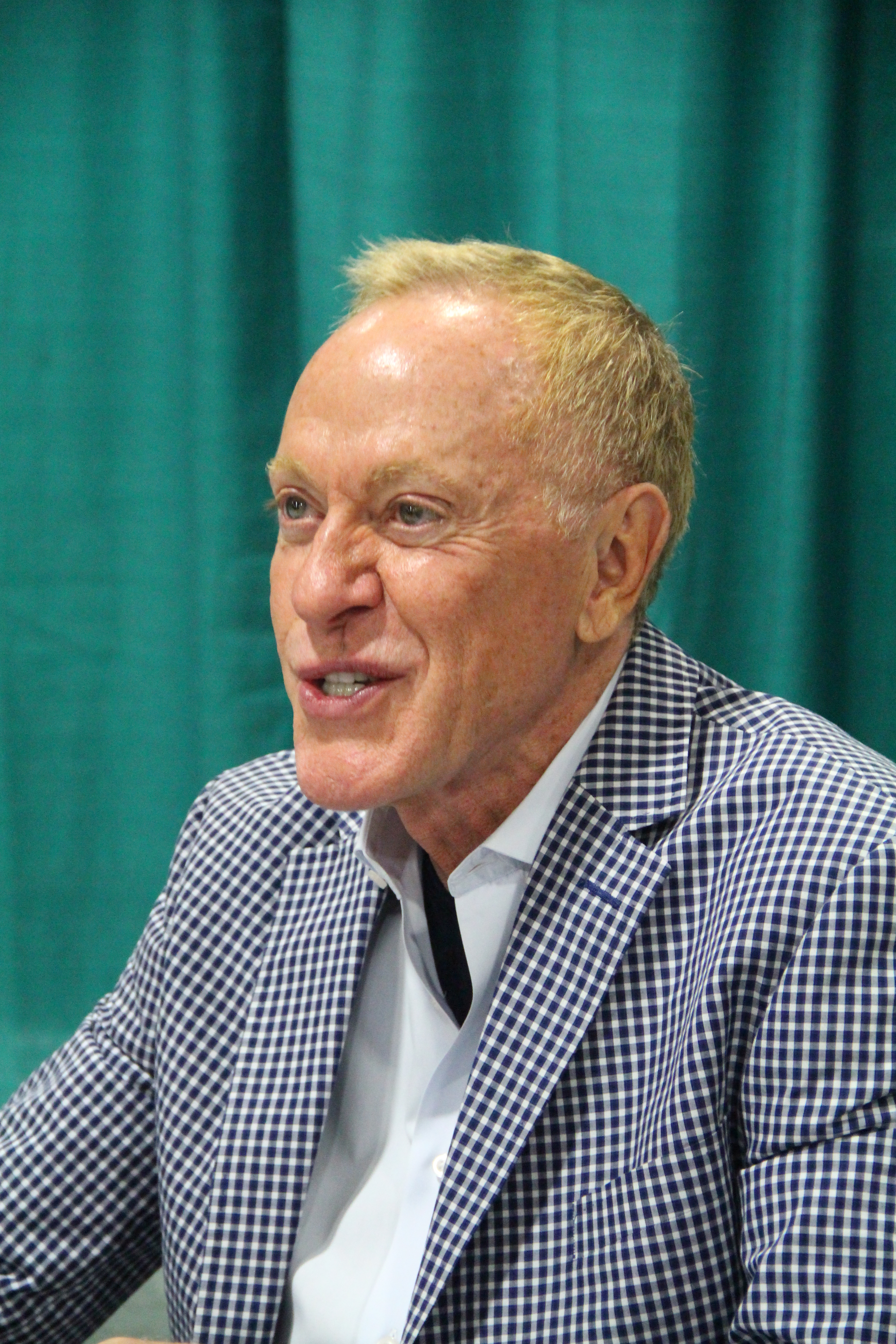
- O'Connell at the 2015 National Book Festival
- Born: October 9, 1945 (age 80); Washington, DC, U.S.
- Education: Catholic University of America; George Washington University
- Spouse: Reinhardt Lynch (former)
- Culinary career
- Cooking style: Refined American Cuisine
- Current restaurant: The Inn at Little Washington
- Website: www.theinnatlittlewashington.com/about

Patrick O'Connell (born October 9, 1945) is an American chef and proprietor of the Inn at Little Washington, a country inn and restaurant in the town of Washington, Virginia.

== Early life and education ==
O'Connell was born in Washington, D.C., and raised in the nearby suburb of Clinton, Maryland. He was not classically trained as a chef but worked after school at a neighborhood restaurant in his hometown.

O'Connell holds an undergraduate degree in drama from the Catholic University of America and he studied at George Washington University.

He graduated from Surrattsville High School in Clinton in 1963. O'Connell attended the Boy Scout High Adventure Philmont Scout Ranch in 1960 and conducted a 10-day hike at the ranch.

== The Inn at Little Washington ==
Along with his now former business and romantic partner, Reinhardt Lynch, he began a catering business in 1972 in Virginia's Blue Ridge Mountains. In 1978, O'Connell and Lynch opened the Inn at Little Washington in an abandoned gas station. The restaurant opened first for friends and acquaintances on January 28, 1978, then officially to the public on February 1, 1978.

Three weeks after opening, a food critic for The Washington Star, John Rosson, visited the inn for dinner. In April 1978, Rosson's article was printed, proclaiming O'Connell's Inn at Little Washington as "the best restaurant within 150 miles of Washington D.C."

The Inn has won the Mobil Travel Guide's Five-Star Awards for its restaurant and accommodations for 14 years. In 2018, the Inn received a three-star rating from the Michelin Guide. The International Herald Tribune rated it as one of the Top Ten Best Restaurants in the World. The Zagat Survey for Washington, D.C. rated it number one in all categories for 14 consecutive years.

== Awards and recognition ==
O'Connell was one of the first American chefs courted by the France-based Relais & Chateaux. He is recognized as one of their "Grands Chefs" (formerly the designation was "Relais Gourmands" referring to establishments of two Michelin Star quality or better). He has been called "The Pope of American Cuisine".

He has won numerous awards including Outstanding Chef in America in 2001 and Best Chef in the Mid-Atlantic region in 1993, both awarded by the James Beard Foundation. In 2019, he was awarded their Lifetime Achievement Award. He is a member of the American Culinary Federation and was inducted into the ACF Hall of Fame in 2009. In 2019, O'Connell was awarded the National Humanities Medal.

== Works ==
- O'Connell, Patrick (1996). The Inn at Little Washington Cookbook: A Consuming Passion. Random House. ISBN 0679447369.
- O'Connell, Patrick (2004). Patrick O'Connell's Refined American Cuisine: The Inn at Little Washington. photographs by Tim Turner. New York: Bullfinch Press. ISBN 0-8212-2845-5.
- O'Connell, Patrick (2015). The Inn at Little Washington: A Magnificent Obsession. Rizzoli. ISBN 0847845133.
- O'Connell, Patrick (2026). Main, Middle & Gay: A Chef Finds His Place in the World Against All Odds. ISBN 9781250436382.
