= 2941 Restaurant =

Upscale American restaurant in Falls Church, Virginia

- Interactive map of 2941 Restaurant

Restaurant information
- Location: Falls Church, Virginia, United States

2941 Restaurant, or simply 2941, is a fine dining restaurant in Falls Church, Virginia. It offers contemporary American cuisine with strong French and Mediterranean influences, created by executive chef Bertrand Chemel. The restaurant is celebrated for its picturesque setting, among koi ponds, cascading waterfalls, and striking artwork. It offers indoor and outdoor seating suitable for both fine dining and private events. It can accommodate groups from around 2 up to 200 guests, with customization options.

== History ==
2941 Restaurant opened in the early 2000s inside an office park at 2941 Fairview Park Drive in Falls Church, Virginia, bringing upscale French‑American cuisine to the suburban area. Founded by Jonathan Krinn, the venue featured soaring ceilings, koi ponds, waterfalls, and floor-to-ceiling windows, providing an unexpectedly grand dining experience in a non-urban setting. In 2008, executive chef Bertrand Chemel—who had honed his skills in Manhattan kitchens such as Daniel Boulud’s and Laurent Tourondel’s—took the helm. Under his leadership, 2941 became well-known for refined contemporary American dishes infused with French and Mediterranean flavors.

By late 2011, 2941 underwent a major renovation to modernize its space and make its service more approachable. Reopened in January 2012 with a refreshed design, the restaurant shifted from formal white‑tablecloth service to a more flexible, à‑la‑carte menu structure, dropping the traditional chef’s table and spotlighting a remodeled bar area. Despite the stylistic changes, the emphasis on high‑quality, chef‑driven cooking remained constant.

== Reception ==
Following the relaunch, 2941 earned continued acclaim: it was named among Washingtonian magazine’s “100 Very Best Restaurants” in both 2014 and 2017, and consistently appeared in Northern Virginia Magazine’s top restaurant lists, including #8 in 2018 and #7 in 2020. In 2010, prior to the renovation, the restaurant won prestigious local awards, earning the RAMMY for Best Fine Dining Restaurant and Best Pastry Chef honors. In 2024, 2941 was named a semifinalist in the Outstanding Restaurant category of the James Beard Foundation Awards.
