= McCrady's Tavern and Long Room =

- U.S. National Register of Historic Places
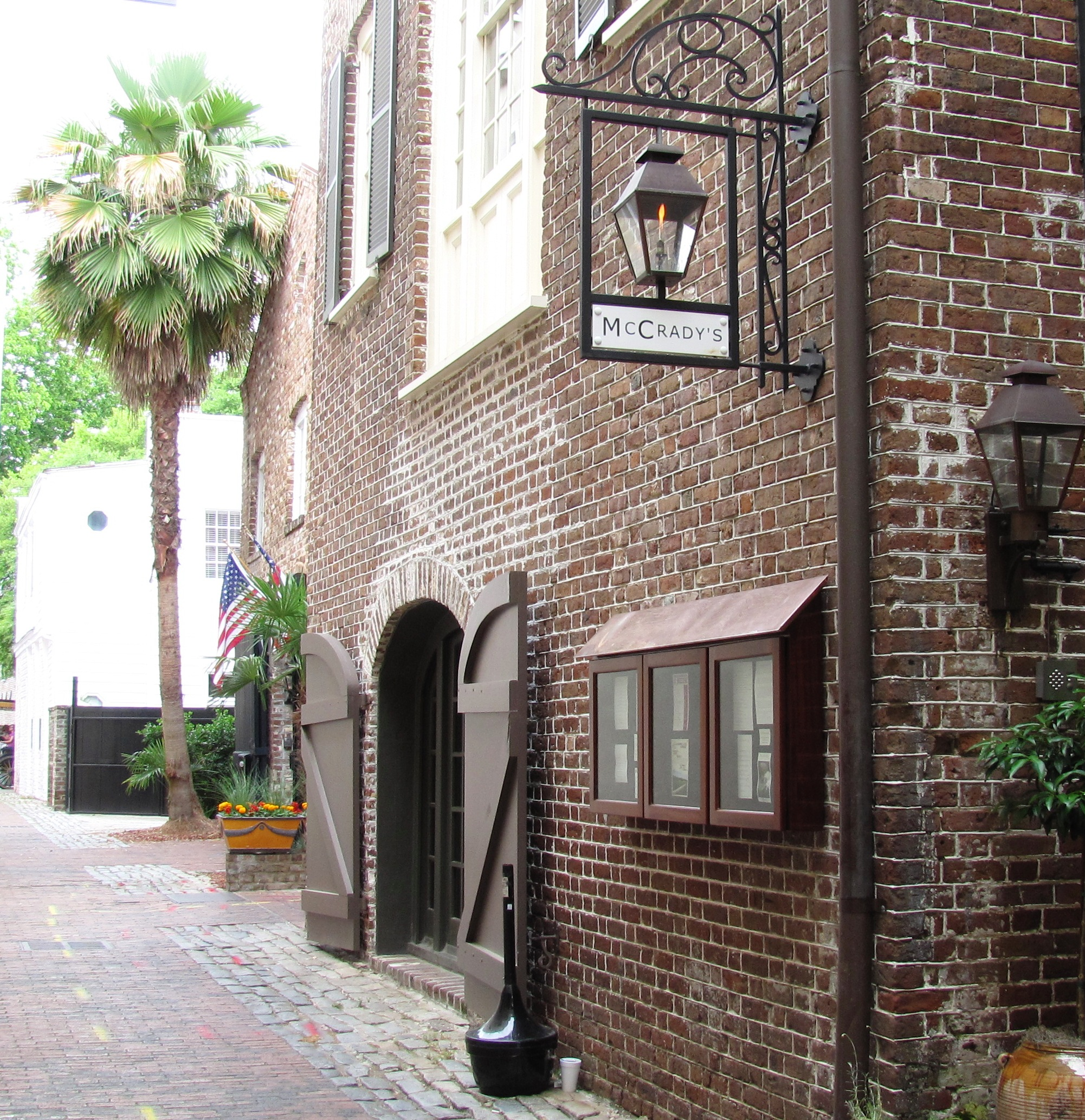
- McCrady's Long Room facade in Unity Alley
- Location: 153 East Bay Street
- Nearest city: Charleston, South Carolina
- Coordinates: 32°46′41″N 79°55′38″W
- Area: .25 acres (1,000 m^{2})
- Built: circa 1767–1788
- NRHP reference No.: 72001199
- Added to NRHP: September 14, 1972

McCrady's Tavern and Long Room is a historic tavern complex located in downtown Charleston, South Carolina. Constructed in several phases in the second half of the 18th century, the tavern was a hub of social life in Charleston in the years following the American Revolution. The tavern's Long Room, completed in 1788, was used for theatrical performances and banquets for the city's elite and is the last of its kind in Charleston. McCrady's was added to the National Register of Historic Places in 1982 for its architectural and political significance.

Edward McCrady (d. 1794), a Charleston barber/vintner/tavern owner and Revolutionary War veteran, purchased the tavern in 1778 and expanded the tavern, and constructed the Long Room over the next decade. In 1791, the Society of the Cincinnati hosted a banquet in the Long Room for President George Washington, who was visiting the city. The building operated as a tavern and banquet hall throughout much of the first half of the 19th century and later served as a warehouse and print shop. The building was restored to its late-18th-century appearance in the 1980s and housed McCrady's Restaurant until its closure in 2020.

== Design ==
The McCrady's Tavern complex consists of two main structures— the main tavern building, which faces East Bay Street, and the Long Room, which faces Unity Alley. The main tavern building is a rectangular three-story brick structure with a flat roof. The building is four bays wide, with its front (east) facade facing East Bay Street. The north facade is flush with an adjacent building, and the south faces a narrow corridor. The rear facade faces a courtyard that connects it to the Long Room. The main tavern building is oriented east-to-west, while the Long Room is oriented north-to-south, giving the complex a "T" shape.

McCrady's Long Room is a two-story brick structure measuring 75 feet (23 m) by 25 feet (7.6 m). The building's front facade faces Unity Alley, a narrow pedestrian alley connecting East Bay Street and State Street. The corridor on the southeast end of the Long Room adjacent to the front has been enclosed and now serves as the complex's main entrance (the entrance to the main tavern building on East Bay is used as a private entrance for the current restaurant's "Chef's Room" guests). The Long Room building's first story consists of an arcade open on the east side, which originally housed stalls for horses. The Long Room building's main room, where banquets and performances were held, occupies most of the second story and originally included a stage and a 16-foot (4.9 m) ceiling. The second story also included an anteroom and a dressing room for performers.

== History ==
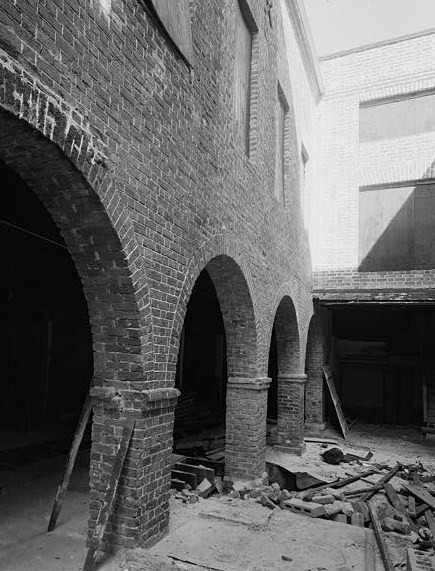
Long Room arcade, prior to restoration

The lot now occupied by McCrady's Tavern was initially granted to a merchant named Jonathan Amory, who sold it in 1723. In subsequent decades, the lot was used for various commercial purposes. What is now the main tavern building had been constructed by 1767 when it was mentioned in a city survey. Edward McCrady, a local barber, purchased the building in August 1778 and began using it as a tavern. Like many colonial taverns, McCrady's offered meals and lodging in addition to providing a venue for gathering and drinking.

During the American Revolution, McCrady was a leader in Charleston's militia. When Charleston fell to the British in 1780, McCrady was arrested and taken to St. Augustine, where he was held until 1781. McCrady eventually purchased lots adjacent to his tavern, allowing him to construct the Long Room, which served as a banquet hall and small-scale performance venue, in 1788. On May 4, 1791, the Charleston branch of the Society of the Cincinnati hosted a banquet for President George Washington in McCrady's Long Room. The banquet was also attended by South Carolina governor Charles Pinckney, several members of Congress, and the mayor of Charleston.

After McCrady died in 1794, the tavern changed hands several times. In 1884, it was converted into a warehouse, and in 1913, the Daggett Printing Company purchased the building for use as a print shop. In the 1970s, after the building had been abandoned for several years, it was added to the National Register, and plans were made to restore it to its late-18th-century appearance.

== McCrady's Restaurant ==
In the early 1980s, the McCrady building was remodeled by the architectural firm Bentel & Bentel for use as a restaurant. The arcade stalls beneath the Long Room were outfitted with tile and modified to serve as a dining area adjacent to the restaurant's bar. The Long Room functioned as a large dining room. Other modifications to the complex included the addition of mahogany paneling and a Baccarat crystal chandelier in what is now called the "Chef's Room." In 2010, the restaurant's chef, Sean Brock, was awarded the James Beard Foundation Award for Best Chef Southeast. Sam Sifton, a New York Times Food Editor, referenced McCrady's as one of the best restaurants outside of the "first tier" of American cities. On April 30, 2020, Neighborhood Dining Group announced that McCrady's would remain closed permanently after its shutdown due to the COVID-19 pandemic.
