= History of Japanese Americans in Portland, Oregon =

Japanese Americans (in Portland, Oregon)
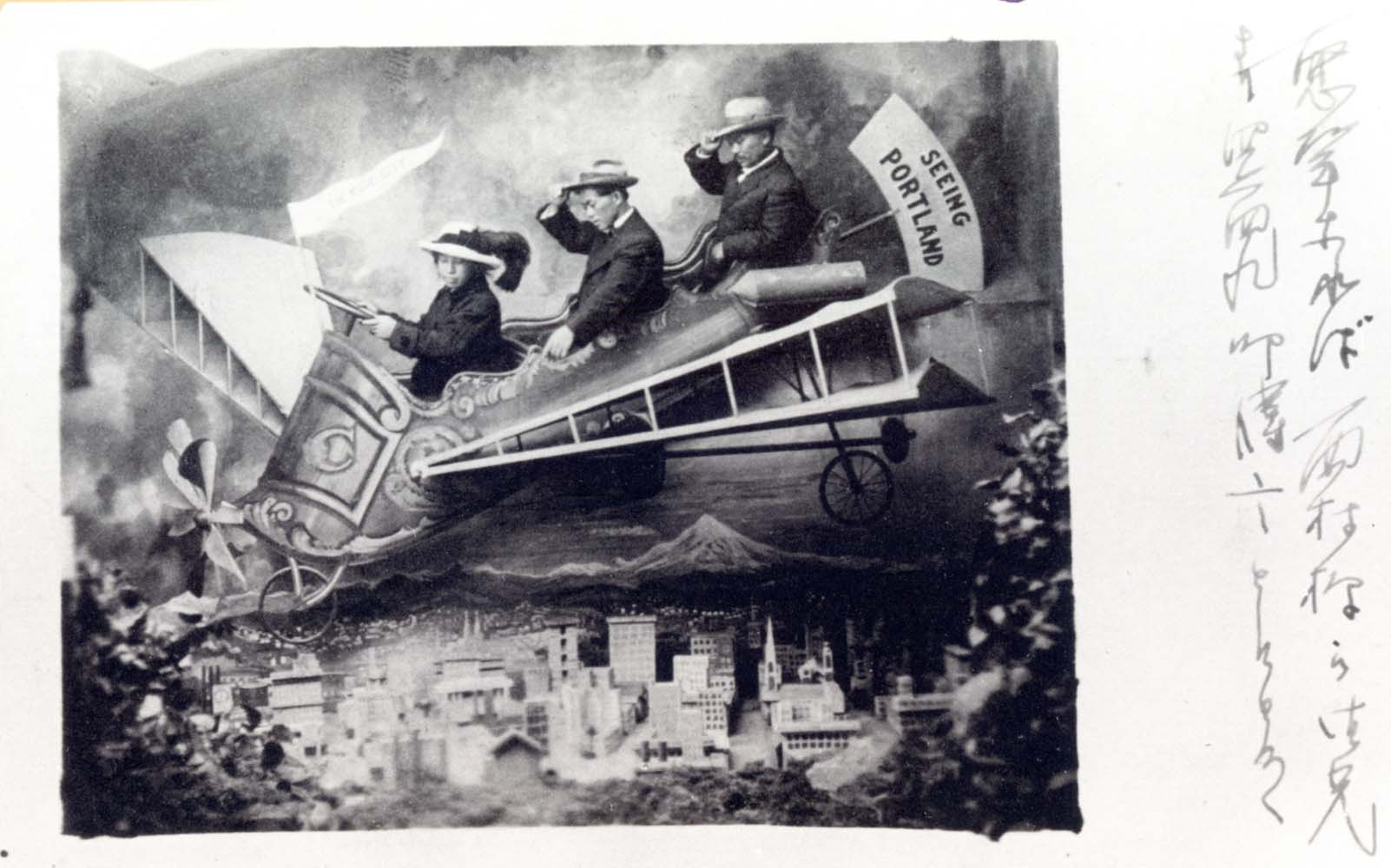
- Seeing Portland novelty postcard, 1914

Total population
- 3,000 (plus nearly 6,000 more in metropolitan area) (2010)

Languages
- English and Japanese

Religion
- Buddhism and Protestantism

The history of Japanese Americans and members of the Japanese diaspora community, known as Nikkei (日系), in the greater Portland, Oregon area dates back to the early 19th century. Large scale immigration began in the 1890s with the growth of the logging and railroad industries in the Pacific Northwest, after the Chinese Exclusion Act of 1882 limited migration of new cheap labor from China and those other areas controlled by the Qing dynasty.

== History ==
=== Early years ===
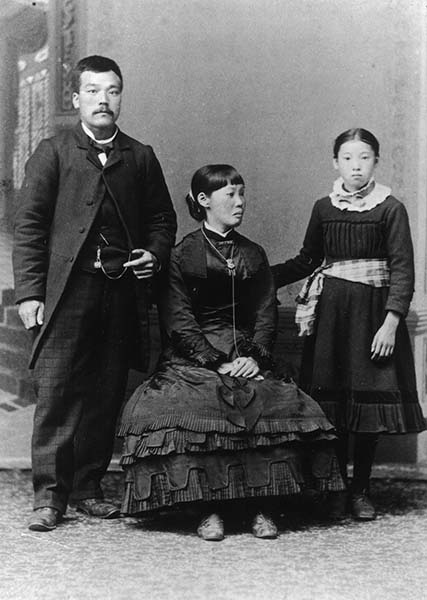
Miyo Iwakoshi (center) with her brother, Riki, and adopted daughter, Tama Jewel Nitobe Mckinnon (1886)

The first historical record of Japanese in the Portland area is that of the three castaways Iwakichi, Kyukichi, and Otokichi, who lived for several months at Fort Vancouver in 1834. They were the sole survivors of a Japanese rice transport ship that had been caught in a typhoon, damaged, and blown far off course. After more than a year at sea, their rudderless ship finally beached on the northwest corner of the Olympic Peninsula, where they were briefly enslaved by the indigenous Makah people. Upon hearing of the three Asian captives, John McLoughlin, the Chief Factor (agent) for the Columbia District at the Hudson's Bay Company, secured their release and had them delivered to Fort Vancouver. They stayed there, along the banks of the Columbia River, for several months before eventually heading to London and then back to Asia.

=== The first Japanese Oregonians ===
The first person of Japanese descent to permanently settle in the Portland area was said to have been the Issei 27-year-old Miyo Iwakoshi who moved to the area in 1880 with her family from northern Japan. She was joined by her brother, Riki, her Scottish Australian common-law husband, Captain Andrew McKinnon, and their adopted daughter, Tama Jewel Nitobe Mckinnon. The family would soon move southeast of Gresham to found the Orient sawmill, the surrounding area subsequently became known as Orient, Oregon. The family would experience tragedy as Captain McKinnon died six years later, at the age of 66. However a few years later his daughter Jewel McKinnon would go onto to marry businessman Shintaro Takaki in 1889, in the first Japanese-style wedding in Oregon. Takaki a merchant importer, who worked with Portland's Chinese-American community, had arrived in Oregon a few years earlier in 1885. With the proceeds from his import business Takaki, his wife, and his mother-in-law would go on to found a restaurant which would serve as an important communal center for the growing Japanese community in Portland. Miyo Iwakoshi died in 1931 and was buried in Gresham Pioneer Cemetery, Lot 85, Grave 3E, upon which a cedar tree was planted as a memorial. A headstone was dedicated to her on May 29, 1988, by the local Japanese-American community and the Gresham Historical Society.

=== Community growth ===
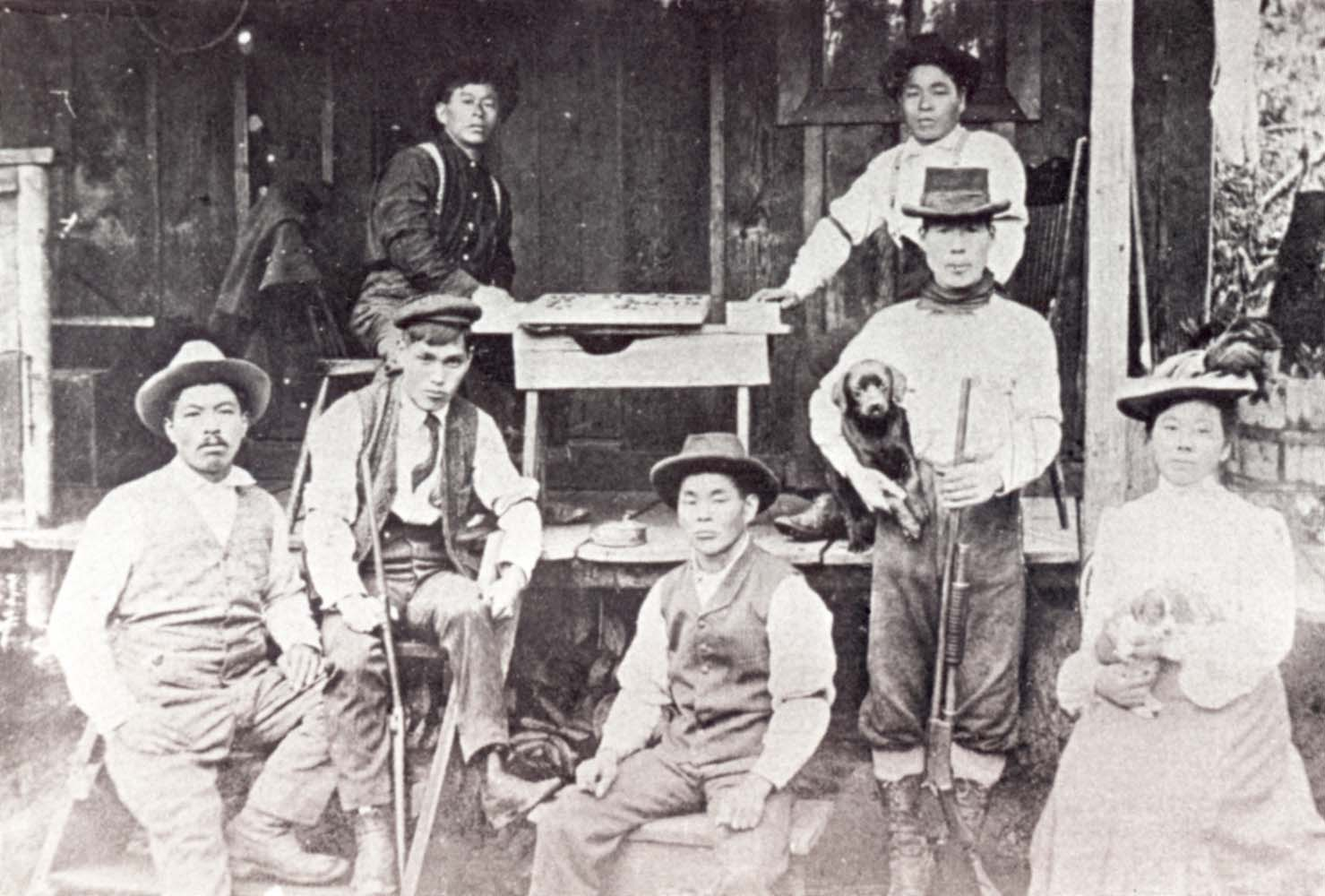
Japanese Americans workers at a railroad camp, Pacific North West (1895)

Large scale Japanese immigration to the Portland area began in the late 1890s, as labor contractors began attracting workers, mainly bachelors in their late teens or early twenties, for the railroad, agricultural, and logging industries around the Pacific Northwest. This was in response to the labor shortages caused by the Chinese Exclusion Act of 1882, which prevented the import of cheap Chinese laborers for 10 years due to growing anti-Chinese sentiment and anti-Chinese violence. As many of these Japanese workers began passing through Portland, the need for hotels, bathhouses, laundries, grocery stores, barbershops and other service-oriented businesses grew, leading to a Japanese community to grow up along the low-rent areas around the Willamette River.

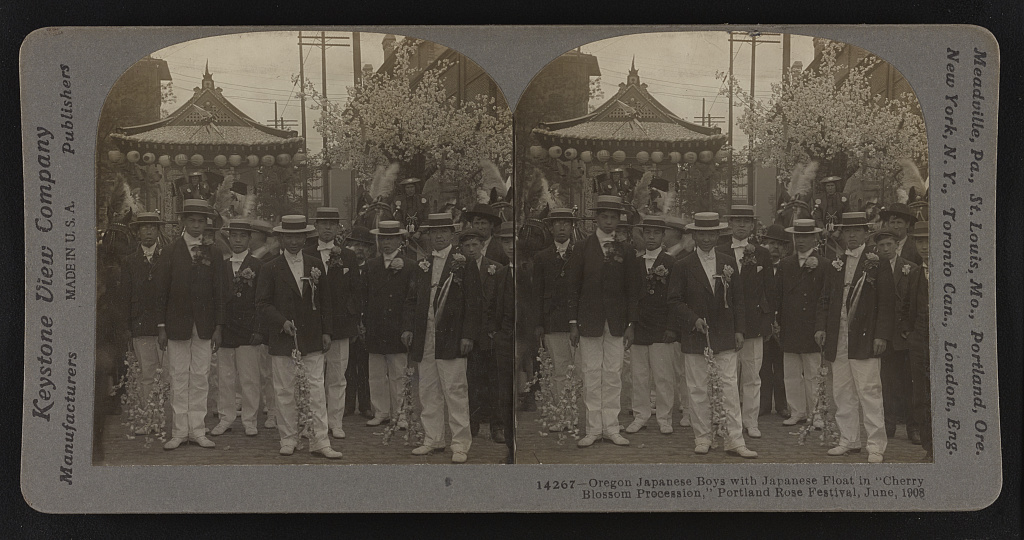
Japanese Oregonian boys with float in Cherry Blossom Procession at the second annual Portland Rose Festival in June 1908

Portland eventually grew to hold two Japantowns: one was located in Northwest Portland's Old Town Chinatown area, between Northwest Broadway and the Willamette River, and the other was in Southwest Portland. Centered around the present day Portland Downtown, it was bound by the West Burnside Street to the north, the Willamette River to the east, Southwest Montgomery Street to the south, and Southwest Broadway to the west.

Before World War II, the Japantown, referred to as Nihonmachi by the Japanese immigrants, in the Northwest District was home to more than 100 businesses, and was Oregon's largest Japantown. The second largest community was up the Columbia River in the Hood River Valley, centered on Hood River, Oregon. At this time both Japantowns in Portland included in total: eighty-six hotels and apartments; seven tailors; fourteen restaurants; twelve barbershops; eighteen laundries and baths; eight groceries; five gift shops; two transfer companies; three medical doctors; four dentists; four newspapers; two general merchandise stores; two confections and candy shops; two pool halls; one garage; two photographers; two carpenters; one tire shop; two drugstores; one jeweler.

Several Japanese language schools operated in the Portland area, with the North Japanese School, Katei Gakuen, serving students in the northwest Japantown. One school St. Paul Miki, named for one of the 26 Martyrs of Japan, was founded by Catholic nuns from Marylhurst University in Marylhurst, Oregon. Japantown's Oshu Nippo was the first Japanese language newspaper published in Oregon.

=== Anti-Asian sentiment and legislation ===
In 1907, the Gentlemen's Agreement between the governments of Japan and the U.S. ended the immigration of Japanese laborers, though it did allow the immigration of spouses and children of Japanese immigrants already in the United States. Prior to 1908, around seven out of eight ethnic Japanese in the continental United States were men. By 1924, due to the spousal immigration allowance, the ratio had changed to approximately four women to every six men. The Immigration Act of 1924 subsequently banned the immigration of all migrant aliens who were ineligible for citizenship from entering the United States entirely. This was seen as a way to mitigate the growing resentment many White Americans had against the financial success of Japanese-Americans in the farming industry and stem growing fears of a "Yellow Peril" along the West Coast, which was adapted from earlier anti-Chinese sentiments and magnified after the Imperial Japanese victory against Russia in the Russo-Japanese War of 1905.

During this time, mainstream racist and anti-immigrant attitudes were represented by the Ku Klux Klan and other organizations such as Asiatic Exclusion League that exerted influences on all levels of Oregon's political and public life. Walter M. Pierce, a racist and a eugenics supporter, was the Democratic candidate in the 1922 gubernatorial election, publicly endorsed by the Klan against Republican incumbent Ben W. Olcott. Pierce subsequently went on to win the election and began to enact a series of anti-immigrant and anti-Catholic laws including the Oregon Compulsory Education Act. Further discriminatory laws including alien land bills, modeled after California's 1913 Alien land law, were introduced to the Oregon legislature earlier in 1917, 1919, and 1921, before eventually passing under Pierce in 1923. By this time, nearly 60 percent of Oregon's Japanese population was involved in the agriculture industry. The new law effectively prohibited all Japanese immigrants from owning land due to federal laws prohibiting Asian immigrants from naturalization. To get around this many Issei parents would put their land ownership documents in the names of their Nisei children, who were American citizens by birth.

In 1925, a predominantly white mob of fifty men forced a group of Japanese saw mill workers out of their homes and jobs in nearby Toledo, Oregon due to growing anti-Japanese sentiment. As a result, the Japanese workers and their families fled the area fearing for their lives. English and Japanese language newspapers on the West Coast actively covered the incident. Though a grand jury did not find sufficient grounds for indicting the mob, a 1926 civil suit resulted in a judgment in the favor of the Japanese workers, creating one of the earliest civil rights judgements in the United States.

=== World War II and incarceration ===
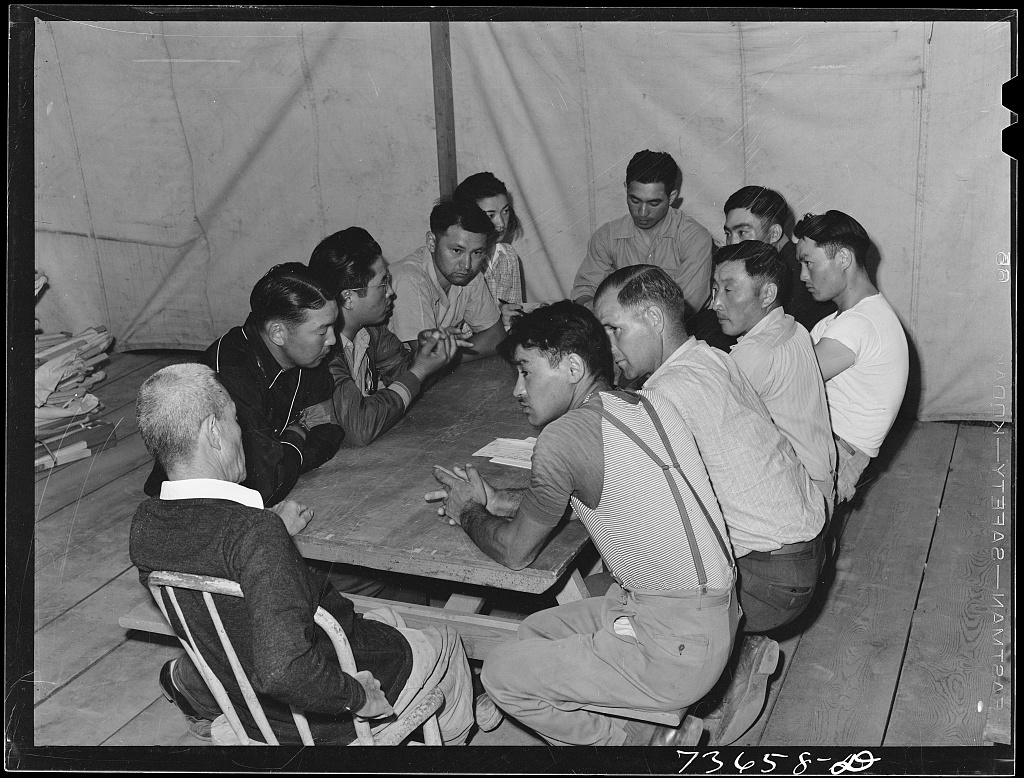
The Japanese American internees of a detention facility in Nyssa, Oregon electing council members (1942)

In February 1942, shortly after the Japanese attack on Pearl Harbor, President Franklin D. Roosevelt issued and signed Executive Order 9066, clearing the way for the mass incarceration of all persons of Japanese ancestry on the American West Coast in inland concentration camps. More than 3600 ethnic Japanese from the Portland region were first ordered to a hastily constructed temporary detention facility, the Portland Assembly Center, on the grounds of the Pacific International Livestock Exposition in Portland's Kenton neighborhood.

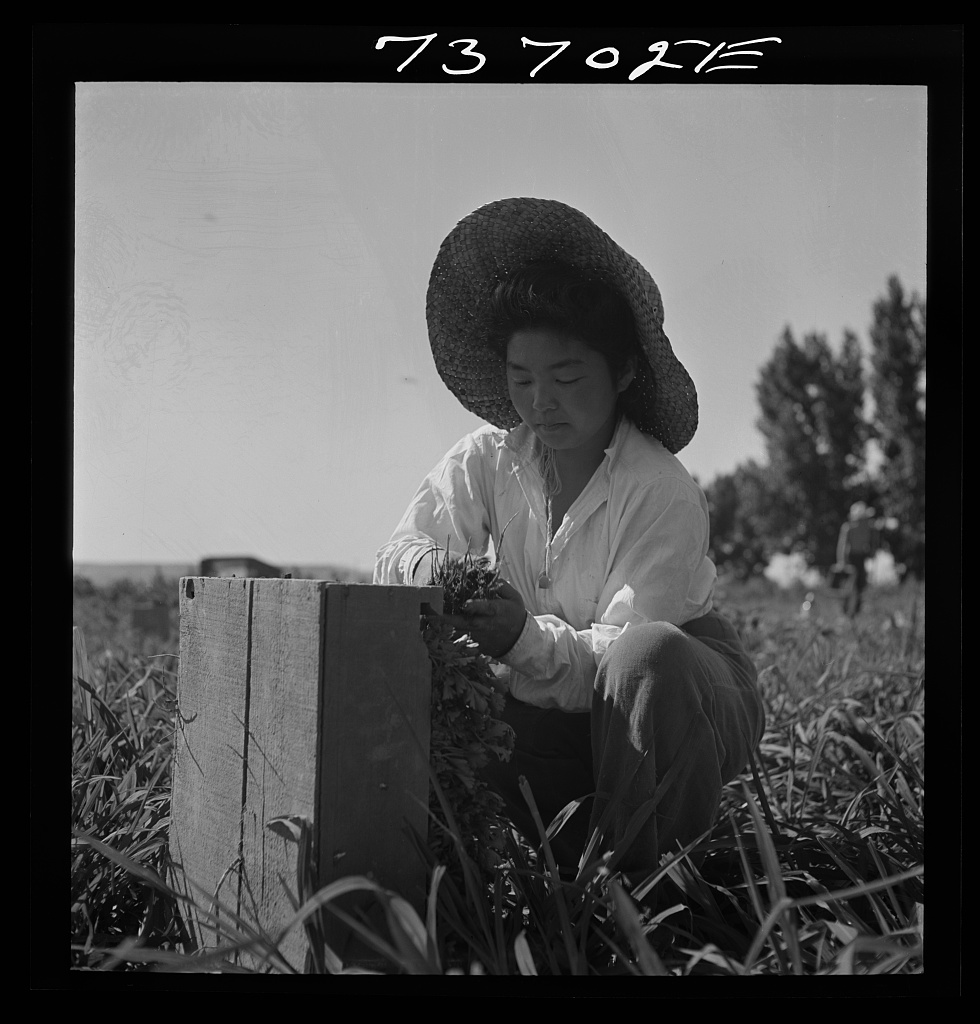
Japanese American internee working in the agricultural fields of Nyssa, Oregon (1942)

When spring arrived there was found to be a shortage of farm laborers in Malheur County, Oregon to cultivate the nearly 12,000 acres of recently planted sugar beet. Local officials appealed to the War Relocation Authority (WRA) to provide some of the recently incarcerated Japanese Americans as farm laborers from the Assembly Center. Though many of those incarcerated in the center had backgrounds in agriculture, it was as farm operators, and almost none had any experience in working as laborers farming sugar beets, which is a particularly physically intensive crop to grow. However, on May 20, 1942, Lieutenant General John L. DeWitt issued Civilian Restrictive Order Number 2, allowing for 400 Japanese Americans from the Portland Assembly Center to move to Malheur County to work as agricultural laborers. This order marked the beginning of the WRA's seasonal leave program where between 1942 and 1944, approximately 33,000 Japanese Americans were allowed to leave the assembly and incarceration centers, along the west coast, for a few months time to work as agricultural laborers.

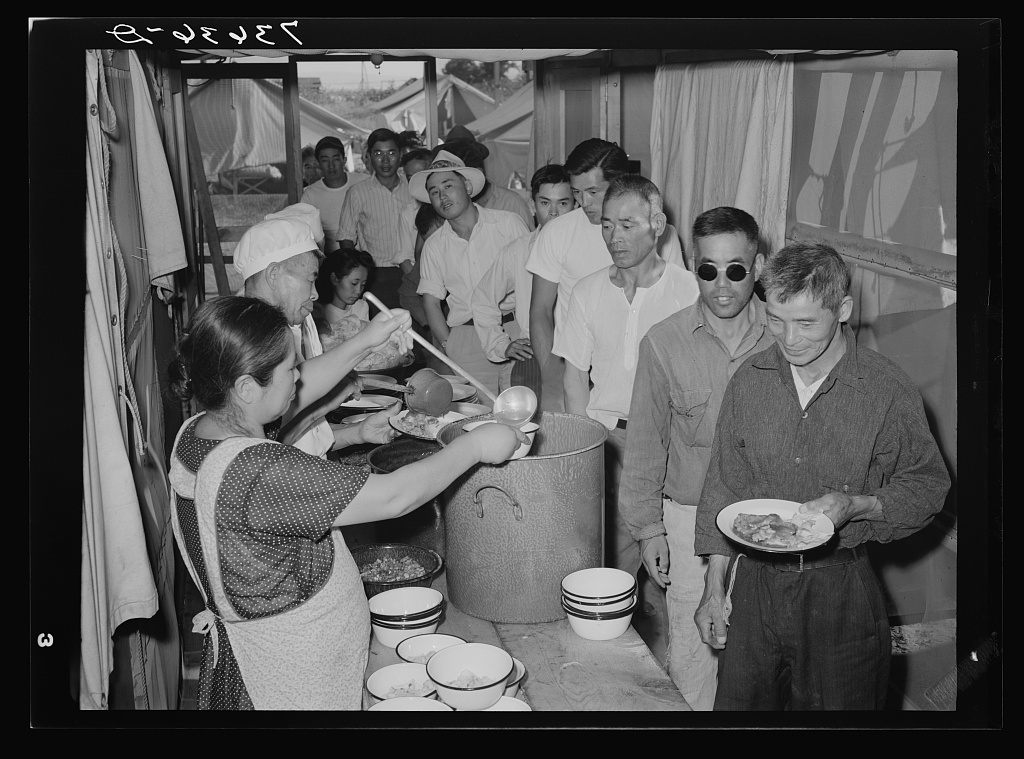
Cooperative mess hall of the Japanese-Americans farm labor camp in Malheur County, Oregon (1942)

Most of the rest of the Japanese Americans in Portland were sent in groups by rail to the Minidoka Relocation Center in Idaho, following the completion of that camp's construction. Smaller numbers were sent from the assembly center to the Heart Mountain Relocation Center in Wyoming and the Tule Lake Relocation Center in California. Those internees who returned to Portland following the closure of the camps found that Portland's once bustling Japantowns were gone.

=== Resettlement ===
In Gresham, the Japanese Exclusion League held rallies for a law that would deny citizenship to those of Japanese descent. Hood River gained national notoriety when the local American Legion post removed the names of sixteen Nisei servicemen from a public honor roll and sponsored full-page newspaper ads warning "Japs are not wanted in Hood River."

The Oregon Legislature passed an amended, more restrictive Alien Land Law in 1945, prohibiting Issei from living or working on farmland. In 1945, the Oregon House of Representatives also passed Joint Memorial No. 9, a statement calling on President Roosevelt to prevent the return of Japanese Americans.

This meant many families decided to start new lives in eastern locations, for example only about one-half of the Japanese from Portland returned to Portland. Housing discrimination forced many Japanese Americans into limited options. Many moved into Vanport, a 10,000-unit public housing project in North Portland that had been hastily assembled during the war to accommodate the thousands of wartime workers employed in Portland's shipyards.

== Businesses and community organizations ==
Portland's Buckman neighborhood is home to Ota Tofu, which opened in 1911 and has been described as the oldest existing tofu shop in the United States. In 1998, the supermarket chain Uwajimaya opened its first store outside of Washington state near the Beaverton high-tech corridor.

Notable Japanese restaurants have included Afuri, Behind the Museum Café, Biwa, Bluefin Tuna and Sushi, Boxer Ramen, Hapa PDX, Murata, Nimblefish, Saburo's, Sushi Ichiban, Tokyo Sando, Yoko's, Yoshi's Sushi, and Zilla Sake. Kinboshi Ramen, a pair of ramen shops, operated as Marukin Ramen locations until 2021.

The Japanese American Museum of Oregon was opened in May 2021 at the Naito Center on 411 NW Flanders Street, named for local Japanese-American businessman, civic leader, veteran, and philanthropist Bill Naito. The Government of Japan has an official Consular office in downtown Portland at the Wells Fargo Center near Terry Schrunk Plaza.

== Gardens and public monuments ==
The Japanese American Historical Plaza and Bill of Rights Memorial was dedicated on August 3, 1990. Situated on the north end of Tom McCall Waterfront Park, the Plaza was designed by landscape architect Robert Murase and covers of 100 years of Japanese American history in Oregon.

The Japanese American Museum of Oregon opened in 1998 (as the Oregon Nikkei Legacy Center) to preserve and share local Japanese American history and educate the public about the Japanese American experience during World War II.

Friendship Circle, also installed along Waterfront Park, celebrates the sister city relationship between Portland and Sapporo. The artworks Festival Lanterns and Voices of Remembrance also commemorate Portland's Japanese American history. The Ainu and Native American power boards are installed outside the Oregon Convention Center.

In 2013, the Portland Japanese Garden was deemed to be the finest public Japanese garden in North America out of more than 300 such gardens surveyed by Japanese garden experts.

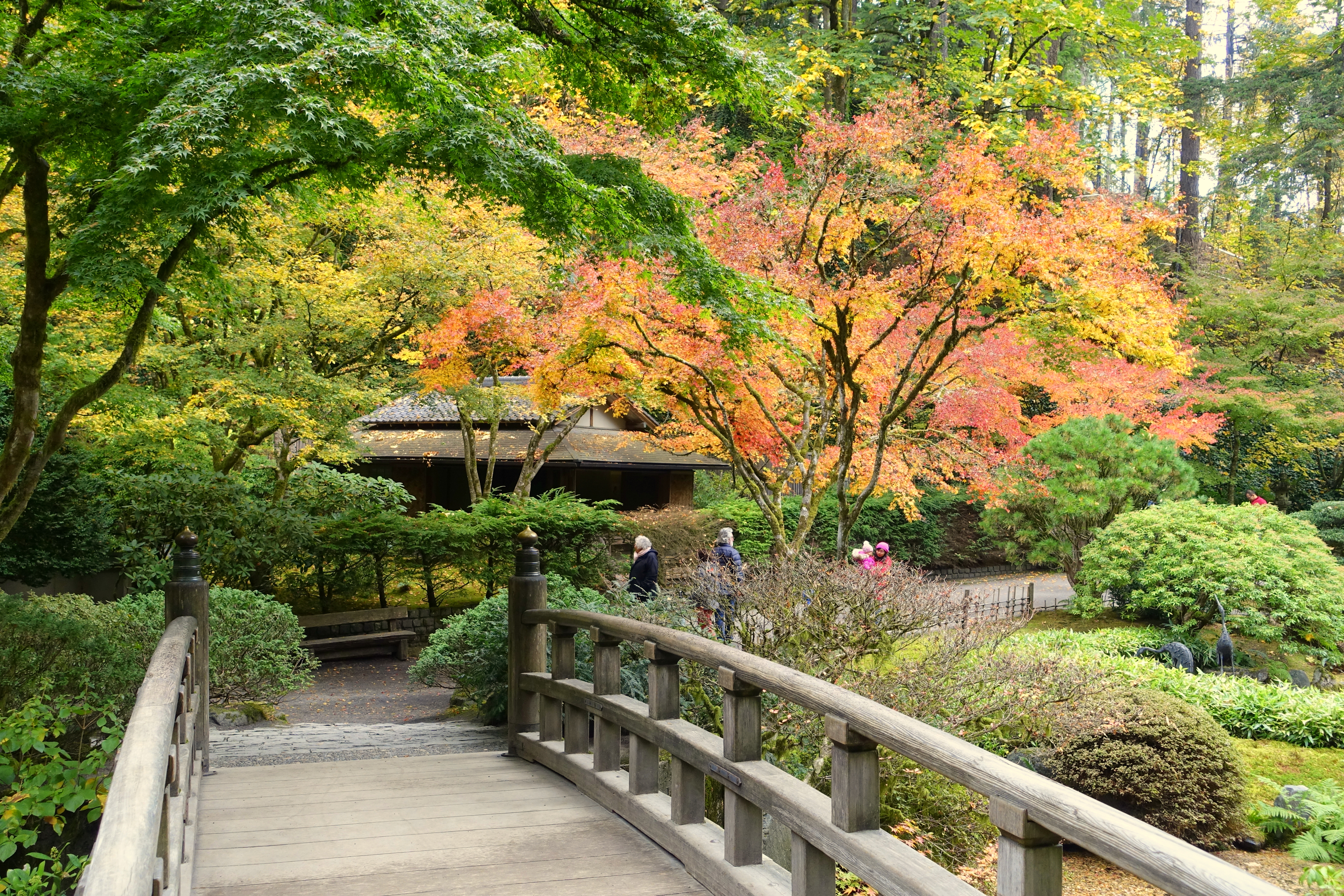
Portland Japanese Garden

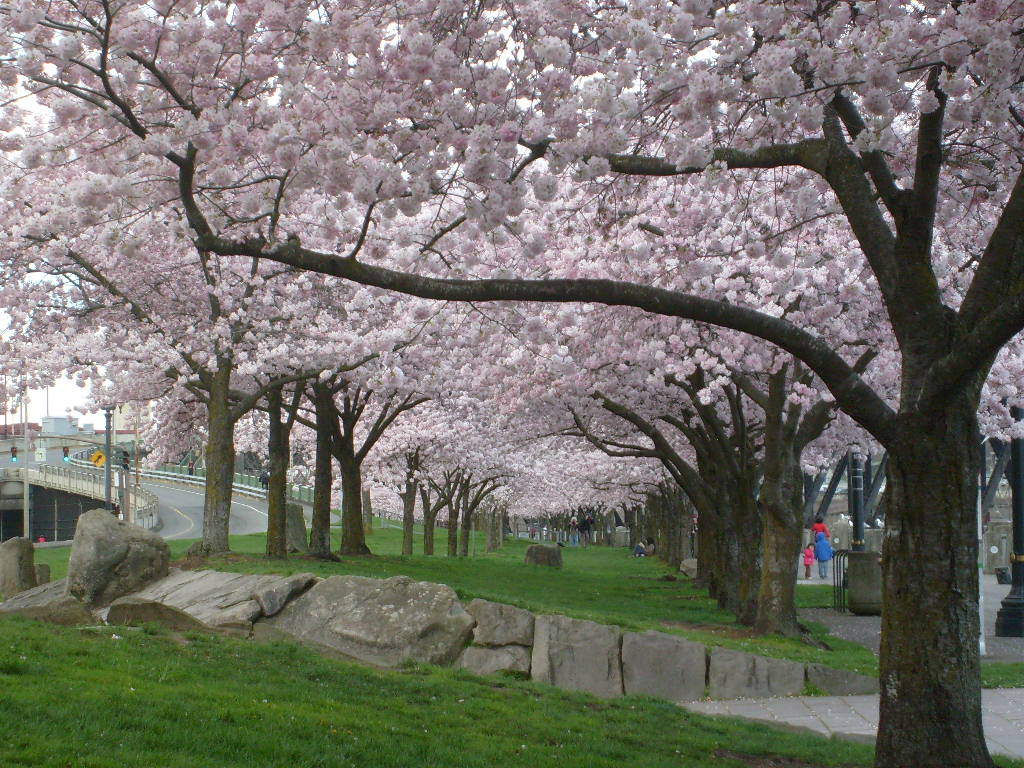
Cherry trees in the Japanese American Historical Plaza, Tom McCall Waterfront Park

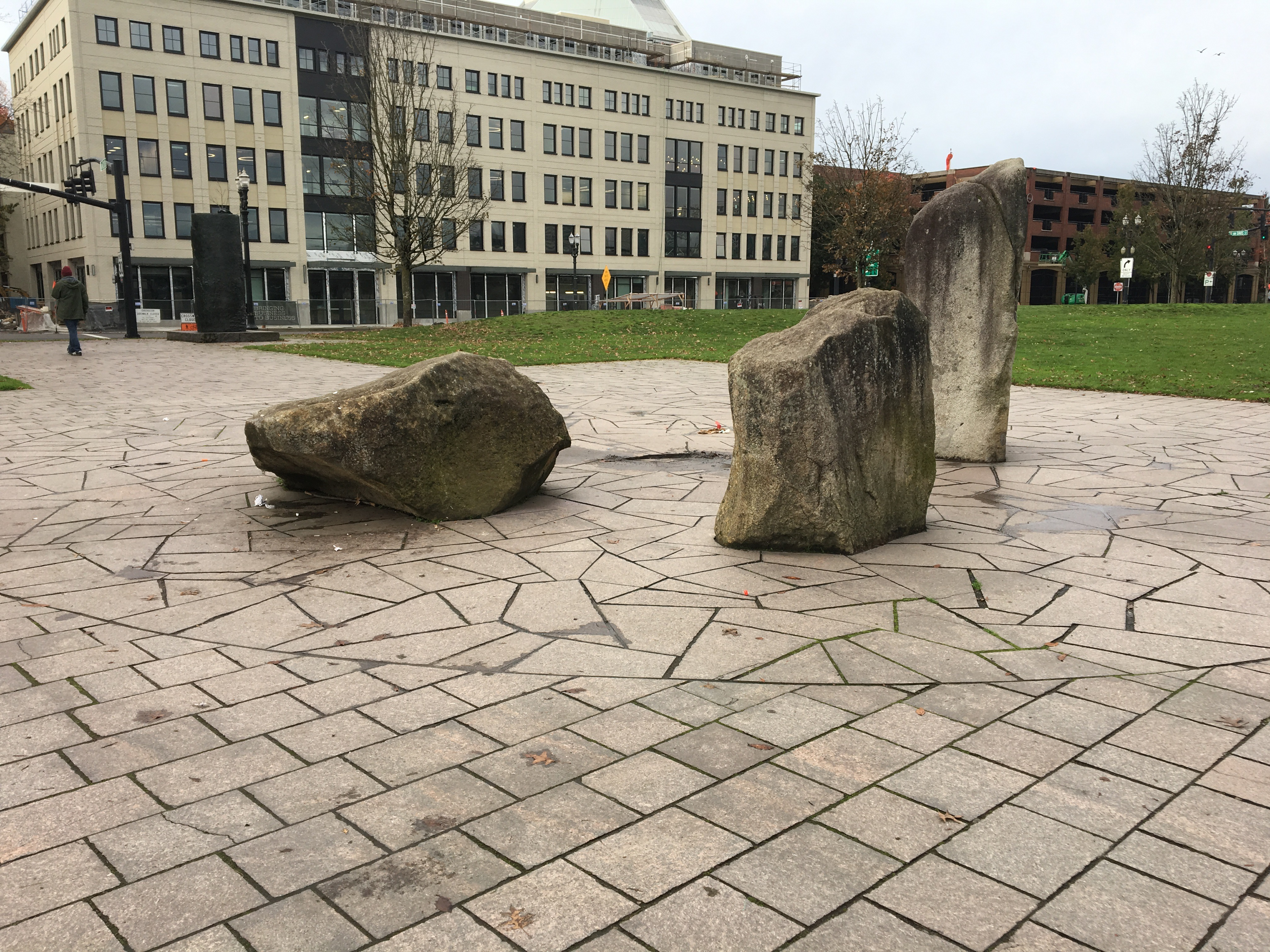
Tom McCall Waterfront Park's Japanese American Historical Plaza

== Religion ==
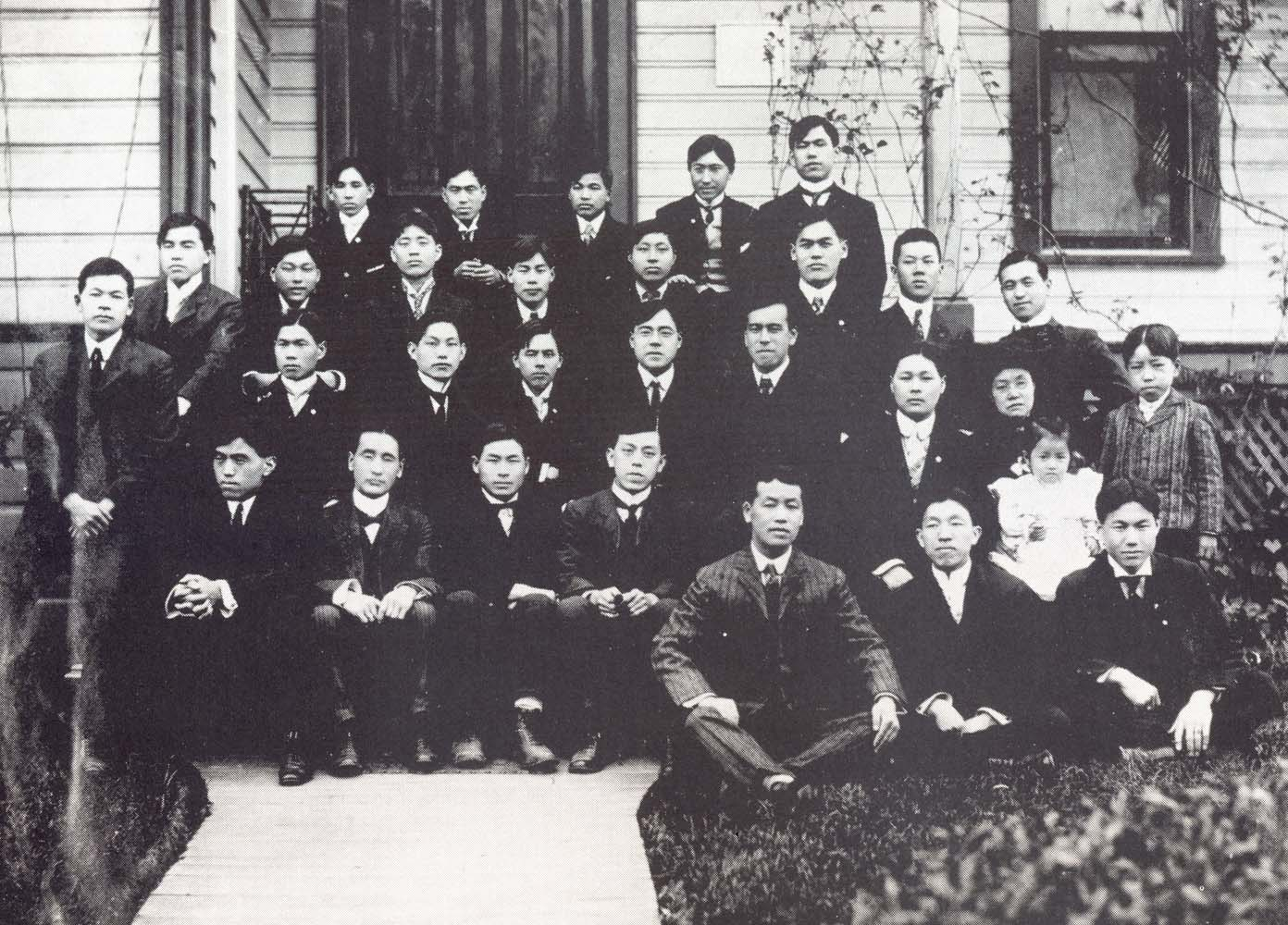
First Congregation of the Japanese Methodist Episcopal Mission in Portland, Oregon (1903)

In 1893, Rev. Sadakichi Kawabe founded the Portland Japanese Methodist Church which continues to operate to this day as the Epworth United Methodist Church for the local Japanese community.

In 1903, the first Buddhist priest Rev. Shozui Wakabayashi arrived and founded the Oregon Buddhist Church. For the first few years of operation the devotees would meet in two rented rooms on Fourth Avenue, and later a storefront on First Avenue. In 1910 a new location was established with the building of a three-story brick building at 86 NW 10th Avenue. Sometime later the organization was renamed the Oregon Buddhist temple and established a more permanent location on 3720 SE 34th Avenue. The temple identifies itself as part of the Jodo Shinshu Hongwanji-ha sect of the Jōdo Shinshū or Shin school of Pure Land Buddhism.

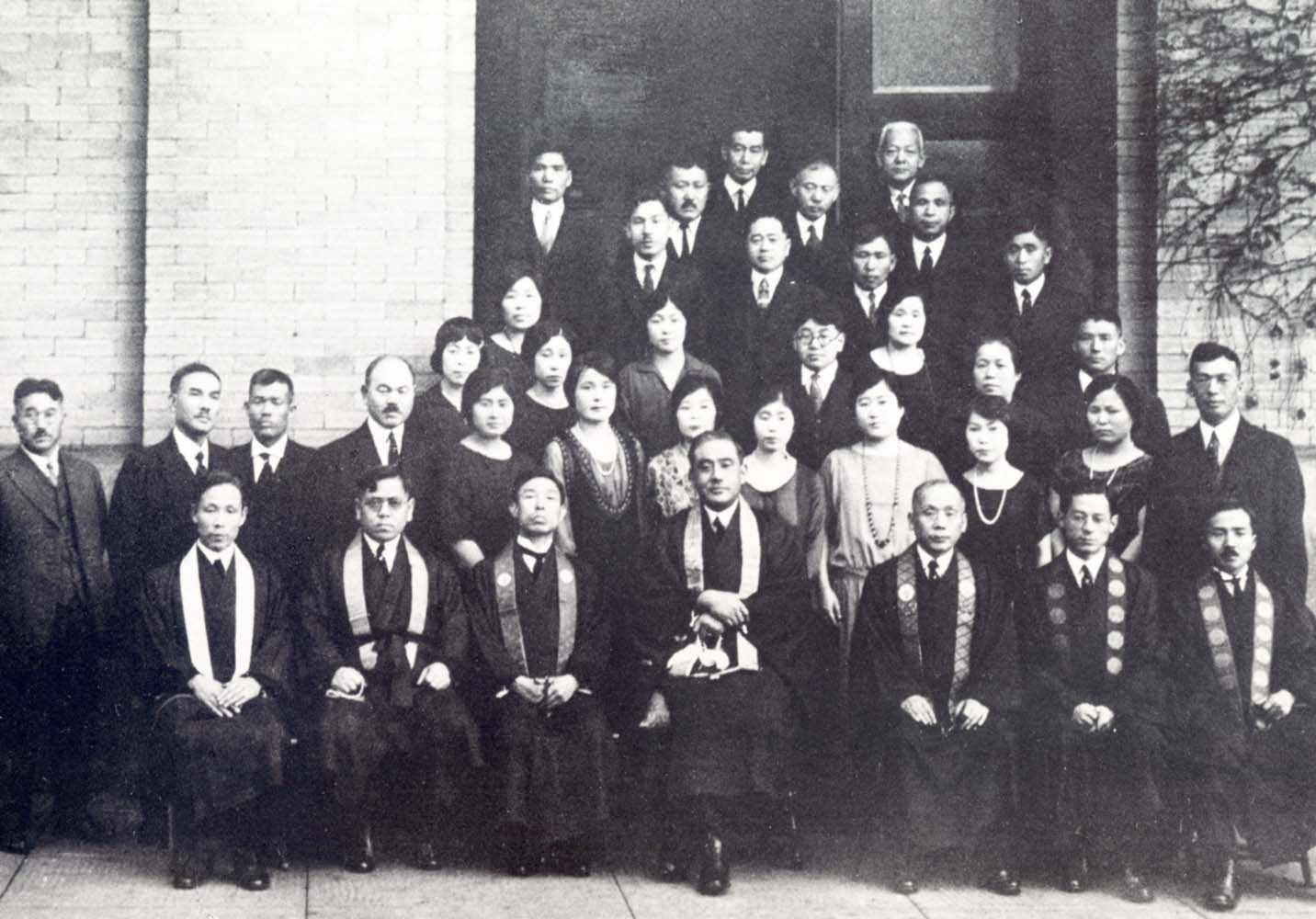
Oregon Buddhist Church honoring the visit of Daika Sonyu Ohtani from Japan (1925)

In September 1930, a charter for the Nichiren Shu Buddhist Church in Portland was approved by the Nichiren Buddhist Church of Seattle and Rev. Okihara was appointed the first chief minister. The official dedication service for the newly founded Church was held on February 22, 1931, with a total of 130 people in attendance. In 1942, as many Japanese-Americans were sent to Minidoka internment camp members of the congregation placed their belongs in the Church for safe keeping, as they were only allowed to take what they could carry with them. In 1959, the city of Portland condemned the old Church building to make way for the current Veterans Memorial Coliseum. As a result, the congregation moved to 2025 SE Yamhill Street where the ground breaking for the current day Nichiren Buddhist Temple was held on March 22, 1959, with the building being complete later that same year in October. The current minister is Rev. Myosho Obata who became the 15th head minister of the Temple in April 2009.

In 1940, the Henjyoji Shingon Buddhist Temple was founded to serve members of Shingon Buddhist community in the greater Portland Metro area. The temple was first established by Bishop Daiyu Henjyoji with his wife Wako Henjyoji. The temple was dedicated at its current location in 1951 and continues to serve the greater Portland community to this day.

== Geographic distribution ==
As of 2010, approximately 3,000 Japanese Americans resided in Portland representing 0.5 percent of the population. Approximately 8,900 Japanese resided in the Portland metropolitan area representing 0.4 percent the total population.

== Education ==
Portland Japanese School, a weekend supplementary Japanese school, was created in 1971 and is under the Japanese Business Association of Portland (Shokookai). It has supplementary education for grades K-12 and holds classes in Tualatin.

== See also ==
- Culture of Portland, Oregon
- Portland Buddhist Church
- Portland Japanese School
- Portland Taiko
- Minoru Yasui
