= Bluefin Tuna and Sushi =

Japanese restaurant in Portland, Oregon, U.S.

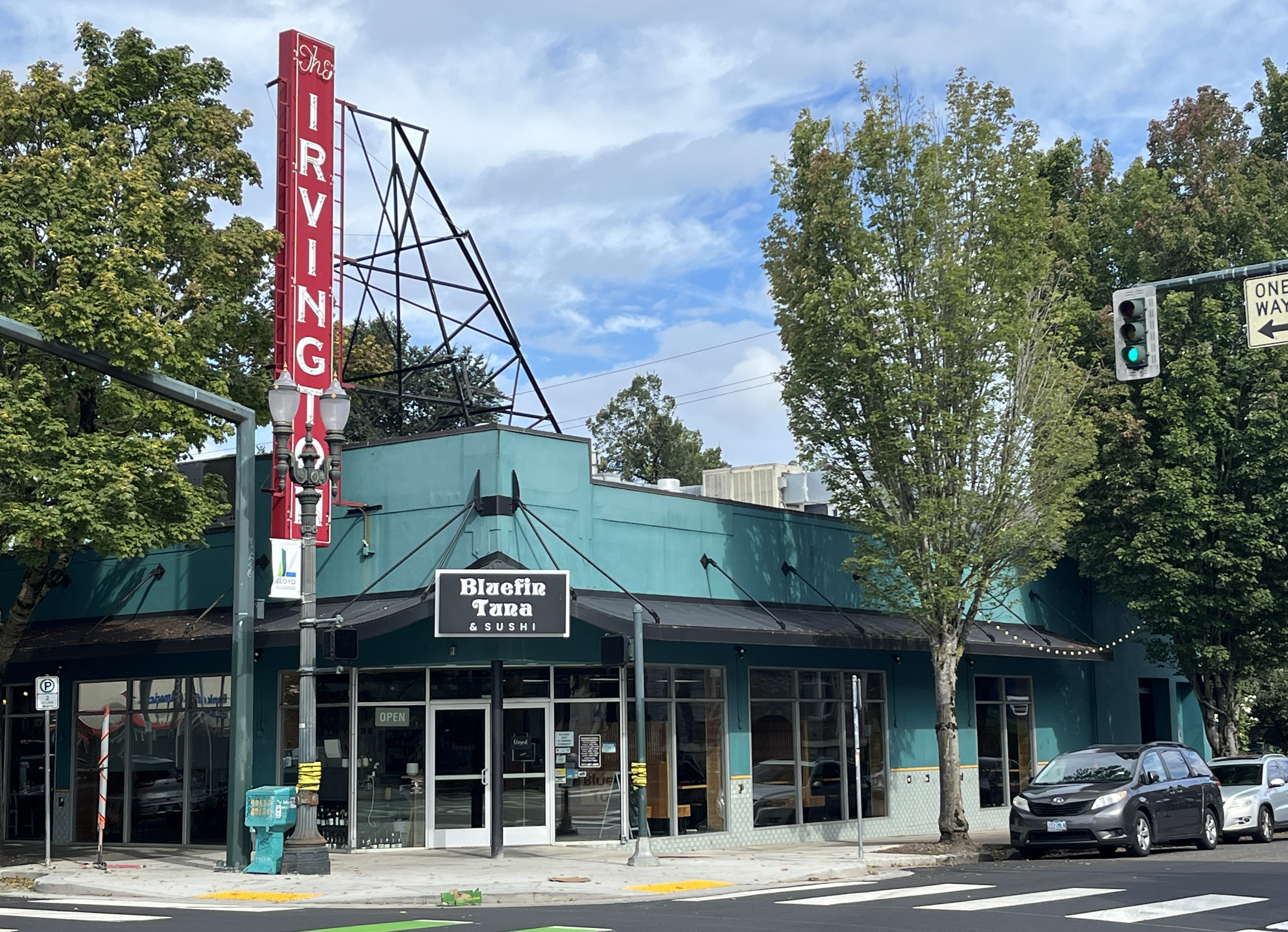
- Exterior of the restaurant in Portland, Oregon's Irvington neighborhood in 2025
- Interactive map of Bluefin Tuna and Sushi

Restaurant information
- Established: 2011 in Seoul, South Korea
- Location: 1337 Northeast Broadway, Portland, Multnomah, Oregon, 97232, United States
- Coordinates: 45.5352°N 122.6516°W
- Website: bluefintunaandsushi.com

Bluefin Tuna and Sushi is a Japanese restaurant in Portland, Oregon. The business was established as Bluefin Tuna in Seoul in 2011.

Bluefin Tuna and Sushi has garnered a positive reception and ranked number 75 in Yelp's 2024 list of the top 100 sushi restaurants in the U.S.

== Description ==
The Japanese restaurant Bluefin Tuna and Sushi operates on Broadway in northeast Portland's Irvington neighborhood. Specialties include bluefin, chutoro, otoro, and toro, and the restaurant has also offers crab, prawns, salmon, and sea urchin. Drink options include beer, sake, and wine.

== History ==
The restaurant was established as Bluefin Tuna in Seoul in 2011, and expanded to Portland in 2020.

== Reception ==
Portland Monthly included Bluefin in a 2023 list of the city's twelve best sushi restaurants. The magazine's Katherine Chew Hamilton opined, "The fish here tastes vibrant and fatty, and the nigiri offers a compact, appealing way for the fish to shine." She also recommended the emari nigiri set, the miso soup, and the salad with tuna poke. Nathan Williams included Bluefin in Eater Portland's 2023 list of fourteen "delightful" restaurants on Northeast Broadway. In 2024, the website's Seiji Nanbu and Janey Wong included Bluefin in an overview of "knockout" sushi restaurants in the metropolitan area, and Brooke Jackson-Glidden and Maya MacEvoy recommended the business in a list of "jaw-dropping" happy hours in the city.

Bluefin ranked number 75 in Yelp's 2024 list of the top 100 sushi restaurants in the U.S. It was a finalist in the Best Sushi category of Willamette Week's annual 'Best of Portland' readers' poll in 2025.

== See also ==
- History of Japanese Americans in Portland, Oregon
- Japanese influence on Korean culture
- Korean influence on Japanese culture
- List of Japanese restaurants
- List of sushi restaurants
