= Sushi Ichiban =

Japanese restaurant in Portland, Oregon, U.S.

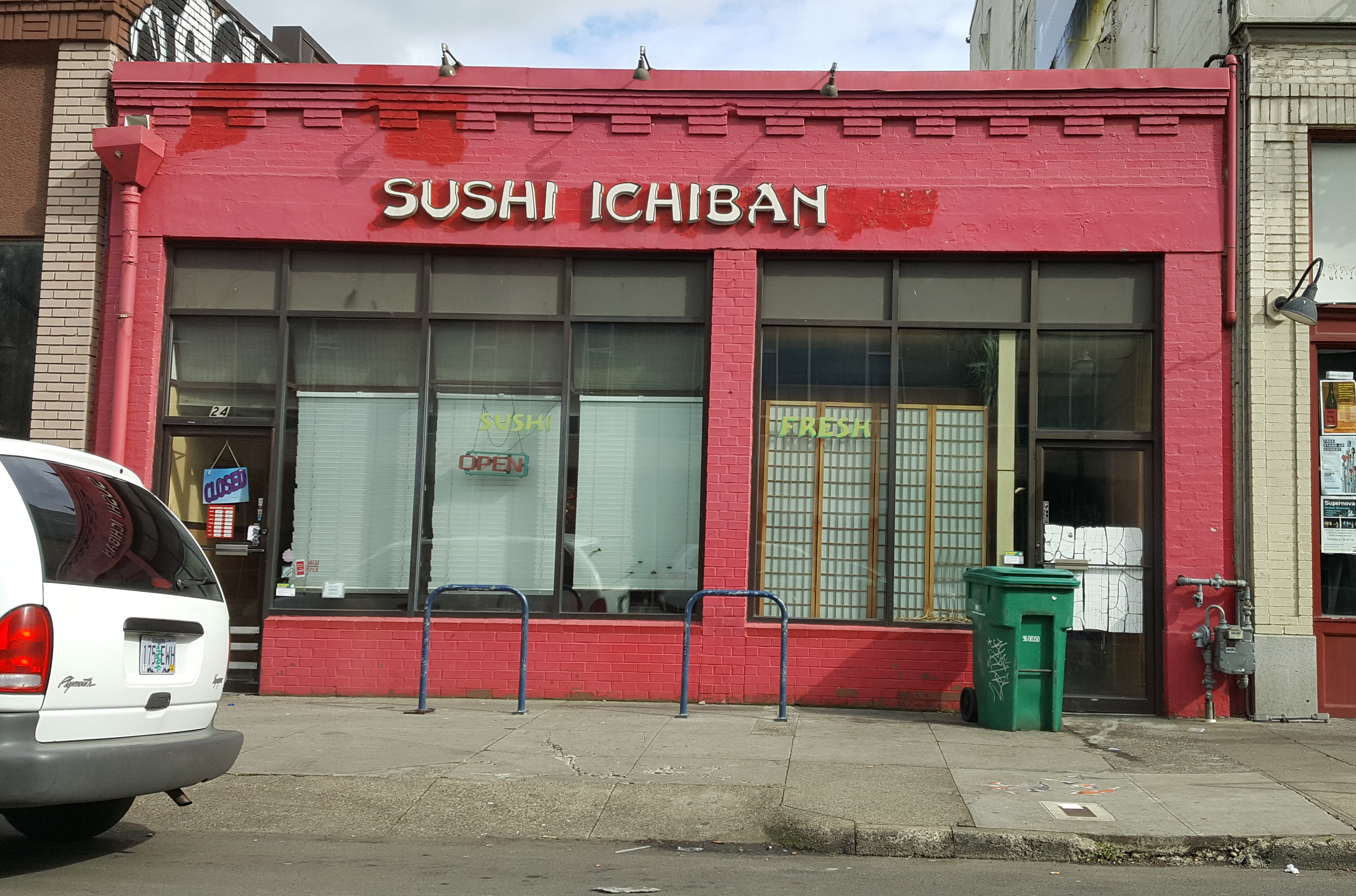
- The restaurant's exterior, 2018
- Interactive map of Sushi Ichiban

Restaurant information
- Owner: Kao Saechow
- Previous owner: Seiji Takahashi
- Food type: Japanese
- Location: 24 Northwest Broadway, Portland, Multnomah, Oregon, 97209, United States
- Coordinates: 45.5235°N 122.6773°W

Sushi Ichiban (nicknamed "Punk Rock Sushi") is a Japanese restaurant in Portland, Oregon, United States.

== Description ==
The Japanese and conveyer belt sushi restaurant Sushi Ichiban, which is also known as "Punk Rock Sushi" because of "the rainbow of hair color choices among staff and clientele", operates on Broadway in the northwest Portland part of Old Town Chinatown. Dishes are delivered to patrons via a small train set on a circular track.

== History ==
Sushi Ichiban operates in the space that previously housed Sushi Takahashi 1 (or Sushi Takahashi One); the business underwent a name change in 2008, during the Great Recession. Seiji Takahashi was Sushi Ichiban's original owner. Kao Saechow is the current owner.

Like many restaurants, Sushi Ichiban was forced to close temporarily during the COVID-19 pandemic. The business re-opened for take-out service in May 2020, with three employees, and also began delivering via Postmates. Indoor dining resumed in mid 2021; many menu options saw a 50-cent increase in price.

== Reception ==
In 2016, Andrea Damewood of the Portland Mercury opined, "I used to love this place—once, someone sent around a game of tic-tac-toe on the actual train that carries the sushi. But it's dropped some in quality over the years, and it's perpetually understaffed. The rice has grown too vinegary, and a recent dinner involved a swamped staff trying their best to keep plates on the track. But their salmon skin hand roll, a heaping of fresh-fried fish with cucumber and avocado, is still one of the best." In 2020, the paper's Suzette Smith called Sushi Ichiban "beloved" and said the restaurant "buzzed with easy-going energy" and offered "eccentric goodies" that changed often.

Matthew Singer included Sushi Ichiban in Willamette Week's 2019 list of Portland's five best conveyer belt sushi restaurants, and Gabby Urenda included the business in KOIN's 2022 list of recommended sushi restaurants. Krista Garcia recommended Sushi Ichiban in Eater Portland's 2023 overview of sushi restaurants in Old Town Chinatown, and Seiji Nanbu and Janey Wong included the business in the website's 2024 list of "knockout" sushi restaurants in the metropolitan area. Nanbu and Wong wrote, "Conveyor belt sushi has its devotees, and the Old Town staple Sushi Ichiban has been one of the city's favorites for decades. The fish is fresh, well-priced, and generous in its portions, trailing behind a toy train engine on a continuously spinning track. This isn't the spot for omakase, but when looking for a slab of salmon nigiri, spicy tuna hand rolls, or creamy scallops, Sushi Ichiban delivers — via a tiny train car."

Noms Magazine included Sushi Ichiban in a 2024 overview of Portland's best sushi. Thrillist says, "Ok -- this might be a sushi train, which can be tacky/ less than great for eating, but Sushi Ichiban breaks the mold with loud rock music, the 'train' is literally a toy train, and the rolls are carefully assembled and delicious."

== See also ==
- History of Japanese Americans in Portland, Oregon
- List of Japanese restaurants
- List of sushi restaurants
