= Portland Buddhist Church =

Historic building in Portland, Oregon, U.S.

- U.S. National Register of Historic Places
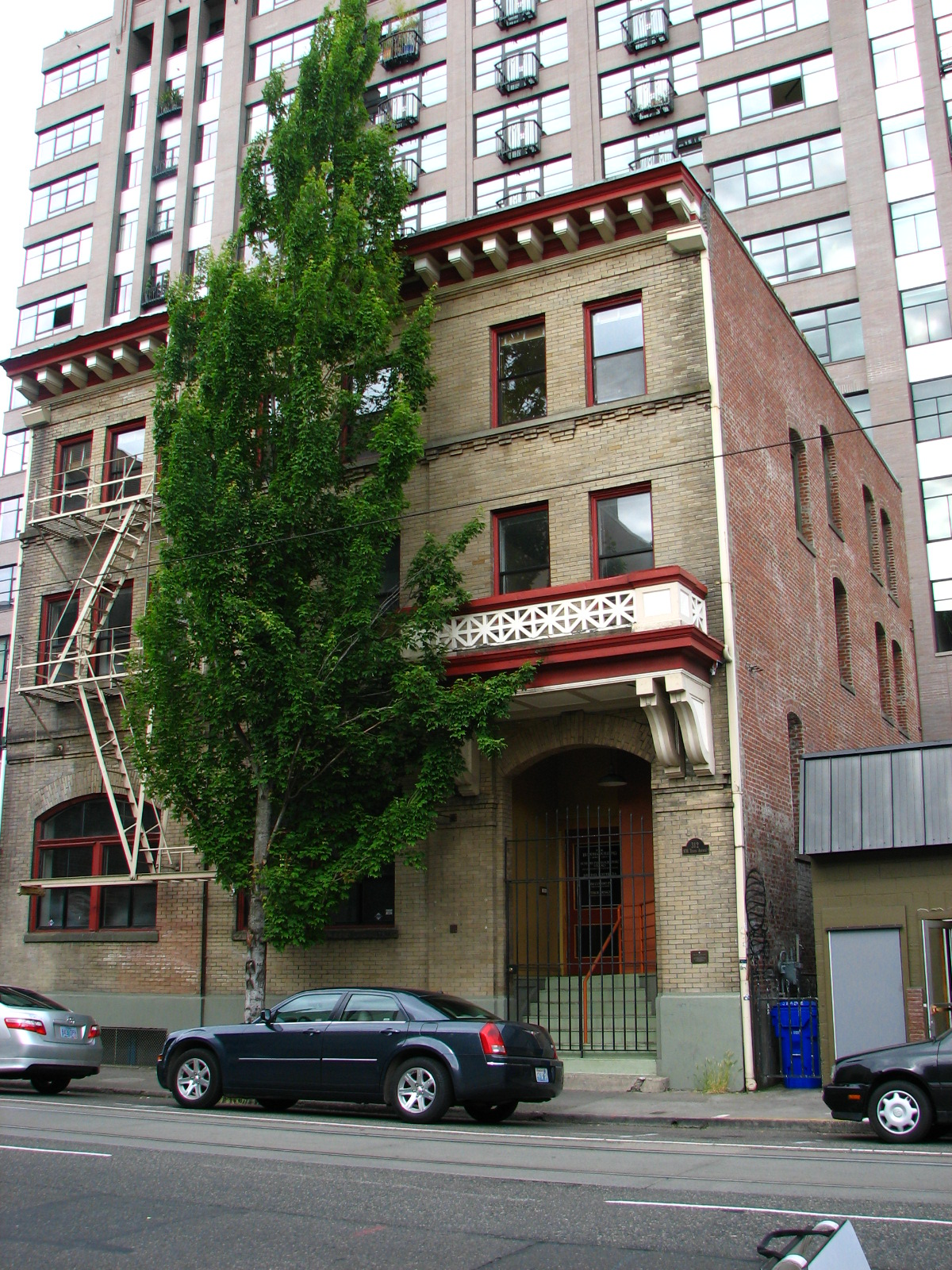
- The building's exterior in 2008

- Location within Portland, Oregon Location within Oregon Location within the United States
- Location: 312 NW Tenth Ave, Portland, Oregon
- Coordinates: 45°31′32″N 122°40′47″W
- Built: 1910; 116 years ago
- Architectural style: Early Commercial
- NRHP reference No.: 03001476
- Added to NRHP: January 21, 2004

The Portland Buddhist Church, located in northwest Portland, Oregon, is listed on the National Register of Historic Places. The church was important to the Japanese-American community that once thrived in Northwest Portland.

== History ==
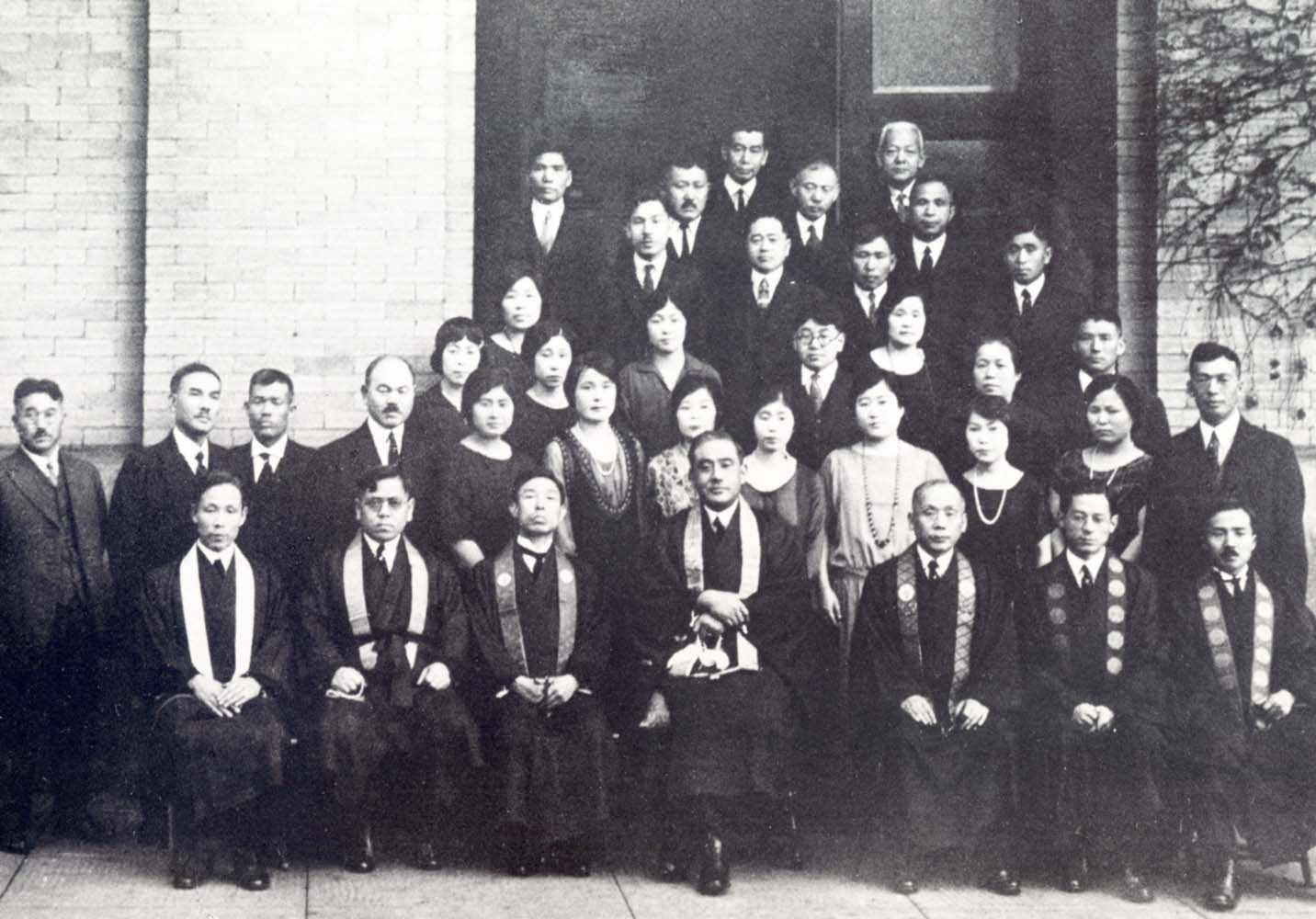
Oregon Buddhist Church honoring the visit of Daika Sonyu Ohtani from Japan (1925)

Founded by Rev Shozui Wakabayashi of the Jodo Shinshu Buddhist Mission of North America in 1903, the Oregon Buddhist Temple was created to serve the growing Japanese American community in Portland. When the building on Tenth Street was completed in 1910, the congregation counted over 500 members.

The property held many of the community's belonging as they were incarcerated during World War II. Then Rinban Tansai Terakawa would be sent to Minidoka along with many of the congregation. Terakawa would never return, dying at the camp in 1944. Rev Hojun Sugimoto would return to the church and lead the community in its efforts to rebuild their lives.

The Portland Buddhist Church served the congregation for over 50 years until a new temple was built in Southeast Portland in 1966, and continues to serves the community today.

== See also ==
- Culture of Portland, Oregon
- National Register of Historic Places listings in Northwest Portland, Oregon
