= Yoko's Japanese Restaurant and Sushi Bar =

Japanese restaurant in Portland, Oregon, U.S.

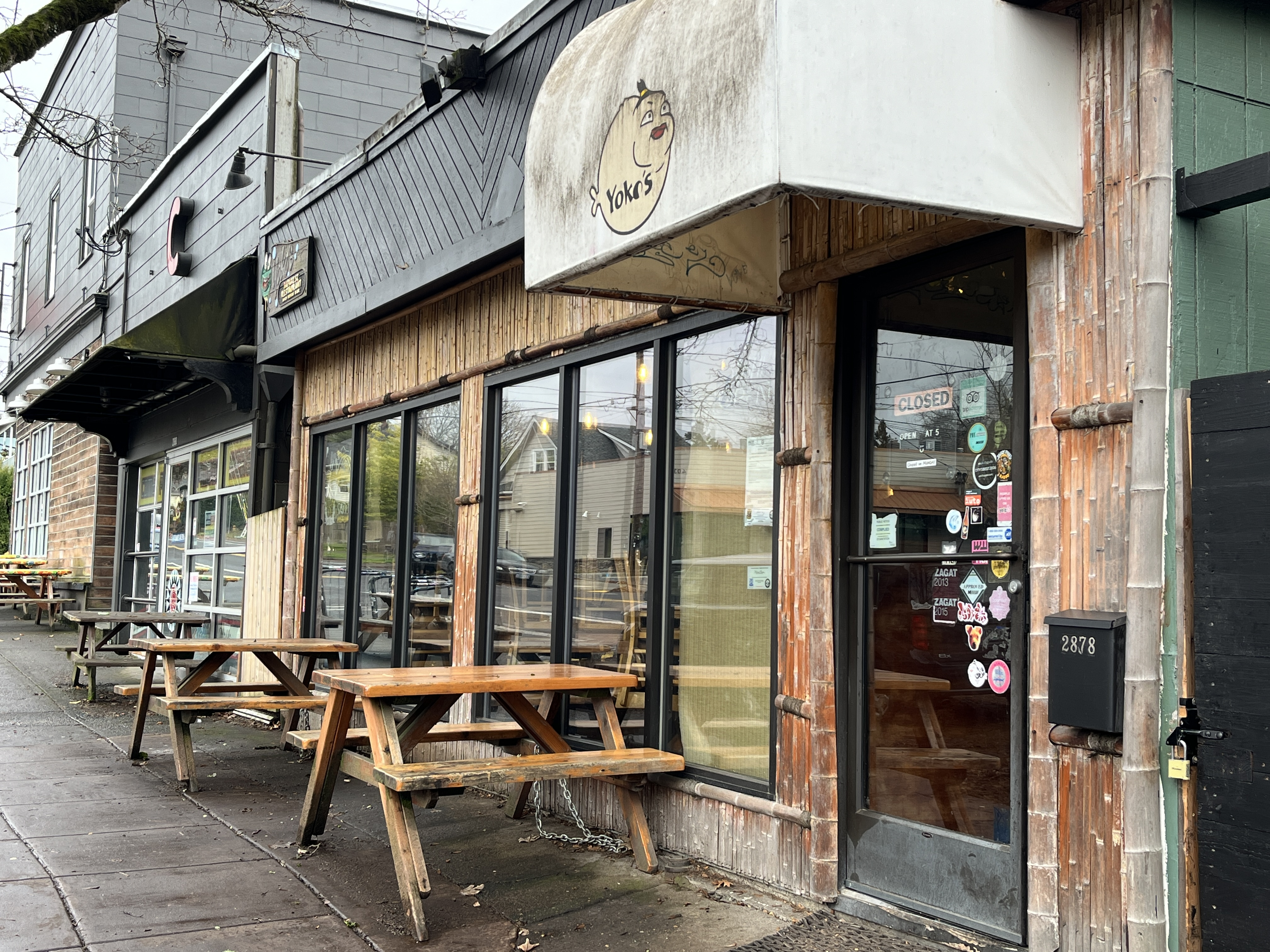
- The restaurant's exterior, 2024
- Interactive map of Yoko's Japanese Restaurant and Sushi Bar

Restaurant information
- Food type: Japanese
- Location: 2878 Southeast Gladstone Street, Portland, Multnomah, Oregon, 97202, United States
- Coordinates: 45.4932°N 122.6360°W
- Reservations: No
- Website: yokospdx.com

Yoko's Japanese Restaurant and Sushi Bar, or simply Yoko's, is a Japanese restaurant in Portland, Oregon. United States. The restaurant was established in Bend, Oregon, in 1989. An outpost opened in northwest Portland's Northwest District in 1994, and relocated to southeast Portland's Creston-Kenilworth neighborhood in 1997. The Bend restaurant has closed permanently. In addition to sushi, Yoko's serves donburi, sake, sashimi, tempura, and other Japanese dishes.

== Description ==
The small woman-owned Japanese restaurant Yoko's was on Gladstone Street in southeast Portland's Creston-Kenilworth neighborhood. It had seven tables and ten counter seats, as well as a dining area with a saltwater aquarium. Yoko's does not take reservations or offer take-out. In Bend, where Yoko's was established, the business was on Northwest Bond Street before closing permanently.

== History ==
Yoko's was established by Yoko Funabashi and Steve DePatie in Bend in 1989. The business opened an outpost in Portland in 1994, initially operating from a converted house at the intersection of 23rd and Glisan in northwest Portland's Northwest District. The Portland restaurant has operated from its current location in Creston-Kenilworth since 1997.

The Bend restaurant has closed.

== Reception ==
Drew Tyson included Yoko's in Thrillist's 2015 list of Portland's twelve best sushi restaurants. Mattie John Bamman included the business in Eater Portland's 2018 overview of fourteen recommended sushi restaurants in the city. The website's Nathan Williams included Yoko's in a 2023 list of recommended eateries in Creston-Kenilworth. Seiji Nanbu and Janey Wong also included the business in Eater Portland's 2024 list of the best sushi restaurants in the Portland metropolitan area.

Michael Russell ranked Yoko's eighth in The Oregonian's 2018 list of Portland's ten best sushi restaurants. He wrote, "Portland's definitive neighborhood sushi restaurant, this Creston-Kenilworth joint has friendly service, beach-shack decor, reggae on the soundtrack and good nigiri, tempura and udon noodles." Katherine Chew Hamilton, Dalila Brent, and Matthew Trueherz included the business in Portland Monthly's 2023 list of the city's twelve best sushi restaurants. Yoko's was a runner-up in the Best Sushi category of Willamette Week's 'Best of Portland' readers' poll in 2024.

== See also ==
- History of Japanese Americans in Portland, Oregon
- List of Japanese restaurants
- List of sushi restaurants
