= Ota Tofu =

Tofu company based in Portland, Oregon, U.S.

Coordinates: 45.5191°N 122.6573°W

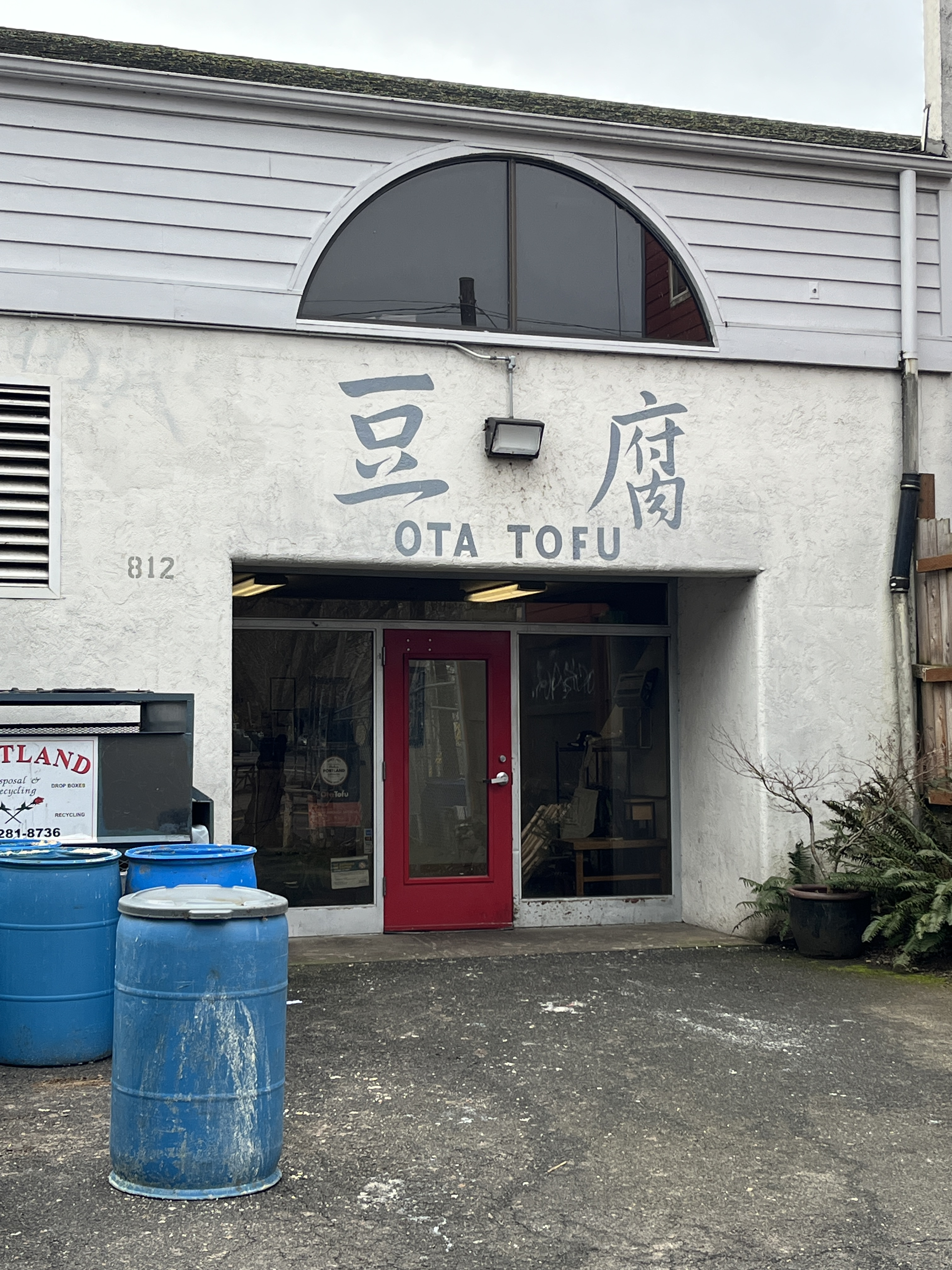
- Founded: 1911; 115 years ago
- Founder: Saizo Ota
- Headquarters: Portland, Oregon, United States
- Website: otapdx.com

Ota Tofu is a tofu company based in Portland, Oregon, United States. It is the oldest tofu manufacturer in the nation.

== Description and history ==
Ota Tofu operates in southeast Portland's Buckman neighborhood. Saizo Ota started the company in 1911. Eileen Ota was later an owner. Sharon Ogata is a co-owner.

== See also ==
- History of Japanese Americans in Portland, Oregon
