= Nimblefish =

Sushi restaurant in Portland, Oregon, U.S.

- Interactive map of Nimblefish

Restaurant information
- Owners: Cody Auger; Dwight Rosendahl
- Food type: Japanese (sushi)
- Location: 1524 Southeast 20th Ave, Portland, Oregon, 97214, United States
- Coordinates: 45°30′42.5″N 122°38′41.9″W
- Website: nimblefishpdx.com

Nimblefish is a sushi restaurant in Portland, Oregon, United States.

== Description ==
Nimblefish is a sushi restaurant in southeast Portland's Hosford-Abernethy neighborhood.

== History ==
Chefs Cody Auger and Dwight Rosendahl opened Nimblefish in December 2017. Brooke Jackson-Glidden of Eater Portland said Auger "has taken Japanese dishes and techniques and incorporated Pacific Northwestern ingredients".

== Reception ==
Matthew Korfhage of Willamette Week said the restaurant serves "some of the most excellent fish you'll ever find in Portland". The Portland Mercury's Benjamin Tepler said Nimblefish "helps fill a gaping hole in Portland's restaurant scene". The restaurant was nominated for Bon Appétit's 50 best new restaurants in 2018. The magazine ranked Nimblefish number 6 in the "Hot 10" list. Nimblefish was included in The Infatuation's 2024 list of Portland's best restaurants. Michael Russell included the business in The Oregonian's 2025 list of the 21 best restaurants in southeast Portland. He ranked Nimblefish number 27 in the newspaper's 2025 list of Portland's 40 best restaurants.

== See also ==
- History of Japanese Americans in Portland, Oregon
- List of sushi restaurants
