= Yoshi's Sushi =

Japanese restaurant in Portland, Oregon, U.S.

- Interactive map of Yoshi's Sushi

Restaurant information
- Established: March 1, 2019
- Owner: Yoshimasa "Yoshi" Ikeda
- Chef: Yoshimasa "Yoshi" Ikeda
- Food type: Japanese
- Location: Portland, Multnomah, Oregon, United States
- Coordinates: 45.4671°N 122.7134°W
- Website: yoshispdx.com

Yoshi's Sushi is a Japanese restaurant in Portland, Oregon. Chef and owner Yoshimasa "Yoshi" Ikeda started the business from a food cart in southwest Portland's Multnomah Village neighborhood in 2019. Yoshi's has garnered a positive reception, ranking fourth in The Oregonian's list of Portland's best new food carts of 2019 and seventh in Yelp's 2024 list of the one hundred best sushi restaurants in the United States.

== Description ==
The Japanese restaurant Yoshi's Sushi operates from a food cart in southwest Portland's Multnomah Village neighborhood.

== History ==
Chef and owner Yoshimasa "Yoshi" Ikeda opened Yoshi's Sushi in the Multnomah Village French Quarter food cart pod on March 1, 2019, with assistance from Nino Ortiz. Orders could only be placed by phone, as of 2023. Yoshi's also caters large events.

== Reception ==
Michael Russell ranked Yoshi's fourth in The Oregonian's list of Portland's best new food carts of 2019. The business was included in the Daily Hive's 2021 list of the Portland's seven "most delicious" sushi restaurants and Noms Magazine's 2024 overview of the city's twelve best sushi options (which recommended the Hotate). Aaron Mesh of Willamette Week said the sea scallop nigiri was among his favorite meals in Multnomah Village in 2023.

Janey Wong included Yoshi's in Eater Portland's 2023 overview of recommended restaurants in Multnomah Village. In 2024, she and Nick Woo also included the business in a "guide" to the city's "most outstanding" food carts, and she and Seiji Nanbu included Yoshi's in a list of "knockout" sushi restaurants in the metropolitan area. The business was also included in the website's 2025 overview of Portland's best food carts.

In 2024, the business ranked seventh in Yelp's list of the nation's one hundred best sushi eateries. The website said Yoshi's has "some of the freshest seafood you can find" and complimented the albacore, Canadian salmon, and Hawaiian fish. The business ranked number 15 in Yelp's 2025 list of the 100 best food trucks in the U.S., based on reviews. Katherine Chew Hamilton included the business in Portland Mercury's 2026 list of the city's top twenty food carts.

== See also ==
- History of Japanese Americans in Portland, Oregon
- List of Japanese restaurants
- List of sushi restaurants
