= Festival Lanterns =

Sculpture in Portland, Oregon, U.S.

- Part of the installation in 2017
- Artist: Brian Goldbloom
- Year: 2006
- Type: Sculpture
- Medium: Granite; steel
- Dimensions: 1.8 m × 1.5 m × 1.5 m (6 ft × 5 ft × 5 ft)
- Location: Portland, Oregon, United States; 45°31′33.6″N 122°40′25.2″W

Festival Lanterns was an outdoor 2006 art installation consisting of granite and steel sculptures by American artist Brian Goldbloom, installed in northwest Portland, Oregon, in the United States. Administered by the Regional Arts & Culture Council, the Chinese sculptures were removed in 2025 following concerns from community leaders that the structures were culturally offensive.

== Description ==
Festival Lanterns (2006) featured a series of outdoor granite and steel sculptures, each measuring 6 feet (1.8 m) x 5 feet (1.5 m) x 5 feet (1.5 m), installed between Northwest 3rd Avenue and 4th Avenue at Davis Street and Flanders Street in Portland's Old Town Chinatown neighborhood. Each of the lantern structures was identical in form and placement, "in response to the festival streets' formal layouts", but house unique carvings that "symbolize one or more of the following subjects: a people of common cultural identity, a place in time, historic uses of nearby structures".

The southern sculpture at 3rd and Davis remembered artifacts from Japantown which stood on that site until the internment of Japanese Americans in 1942, while the north sculpture at 3rd and Flanders commemorates the construction of Portland's historic and current rail systems. According to the Regional Arts & Culture Council, which administered the work, each of the lanterns "can be seen conceptually as a source of 'light' which radiates energy into the community".

== History ==
These Chinese sculptures were removed in 2025 following concerns from community leaders that the structures were culturally offensive.

== See also ==
- 2006 in art
- Friendship Circle, a nearby sculpture by Lee Kelly and Michael Stirling, celebrating the sister city relationship between Portland and Sapporo, Japan
- History of Chinese Americans in Portland, Oregon
- History of Japanese Americans in Portland, Oregon
