= Murata (restaurant) =

Japanese restaurant in Portland, Oregon, U.S.

- Interactive map of Murata

Restaurant information
- Food type: Japanese
- Location: 200 Southwest Market Street, Portland, Multnomah, Oregon, 97201, United States
- Coordinates: 45.5118°N 122.6784°W
- Website: muratarestaurant.com

Murata is a Japanese restaurant in Portland, Oregon, United States.

== Description ==
The Japanese restaurant Murata operates in downtown Portland. The twenty-seat restaurant has a sushi bar and three tatami rooms. According to Fodor's, Murata "draws a crowd of locals and Japanese businesspeople who order from the wide-ranging but well-executed menu".

The menu includes donburi, noodle soups, sushi bento, teriyaki chicken, and udon. Murata has also served a small plate of raw quail egg with yam, tempura natto, ochazuke (fish stock and rice soup with cod roe, salmon, or whitebait), miso soup, and steamed rice.

== History ==
The restaurant has been owned by the same family since 1988. Ryoshiro Murata is an owner.

== Reception ==
Fodor's has described the restaurant as "unassuming but outstanding", as well as Portland's best Japanese restaurant. Best Places Portland has also called Murata the city's best Japanese eatery. Elise Herron included Murata in Portland Monthly's 2017 list of eight "power lunch destinations" in downtown Portland. Karen Brooks and other writers included the business in the magazine's 2024 list of the city's fifty best restaurants. In 2024, Eater Portland recommended Murata in overviews of "jaw-dropping" Japanese and "knochout" sushi restaurants in the metropolitan area, as well as "marvelous" mid-week lunches in Portland and places to eat or drink in downtown Portland. Murata was also in the website's 2025 list of the Portland's best restaurants for mid-week lunches.

Michael Russell ranked Murata fourth in The Oregonian's 2018 list of Portland's ten best sushi restaurants. He wrote, "Once considered Portland's top sushi restaurant, Murata can still slice with the best of them. For the ultimate experience, ignore the set menus in favor of a la carte nigiri, including some relatively hard-to-find raw geoduck." Russell included Murata in the newspaper's 2024 list of the twenty best restaurants in downtown Portland. He wrote, "Once considered Portland's premier sushi restaurant, Murata remains a great value for Japanese food downtown, and a tough reservation to come by on Fridays, Saturdays, or before and after shows at nearby Keller auditorium." He also recommended, "Call a few days ahead for a table, especially if you're angling for one of the private tatami rooms. If you're not in the mood for raw seafood, keep your eye out for the two-entree combination, one of the best dinner deals in town." The business was included in Time Out Portland's 2025 list of the city's eighteen best restaurants.

== See also ==
- History of Japanese Americans in Portland, Oregon
- List of Japanese restaurants
