= Zilla Sake =

Japanese restaurant in Portland, Oregon, U.S.

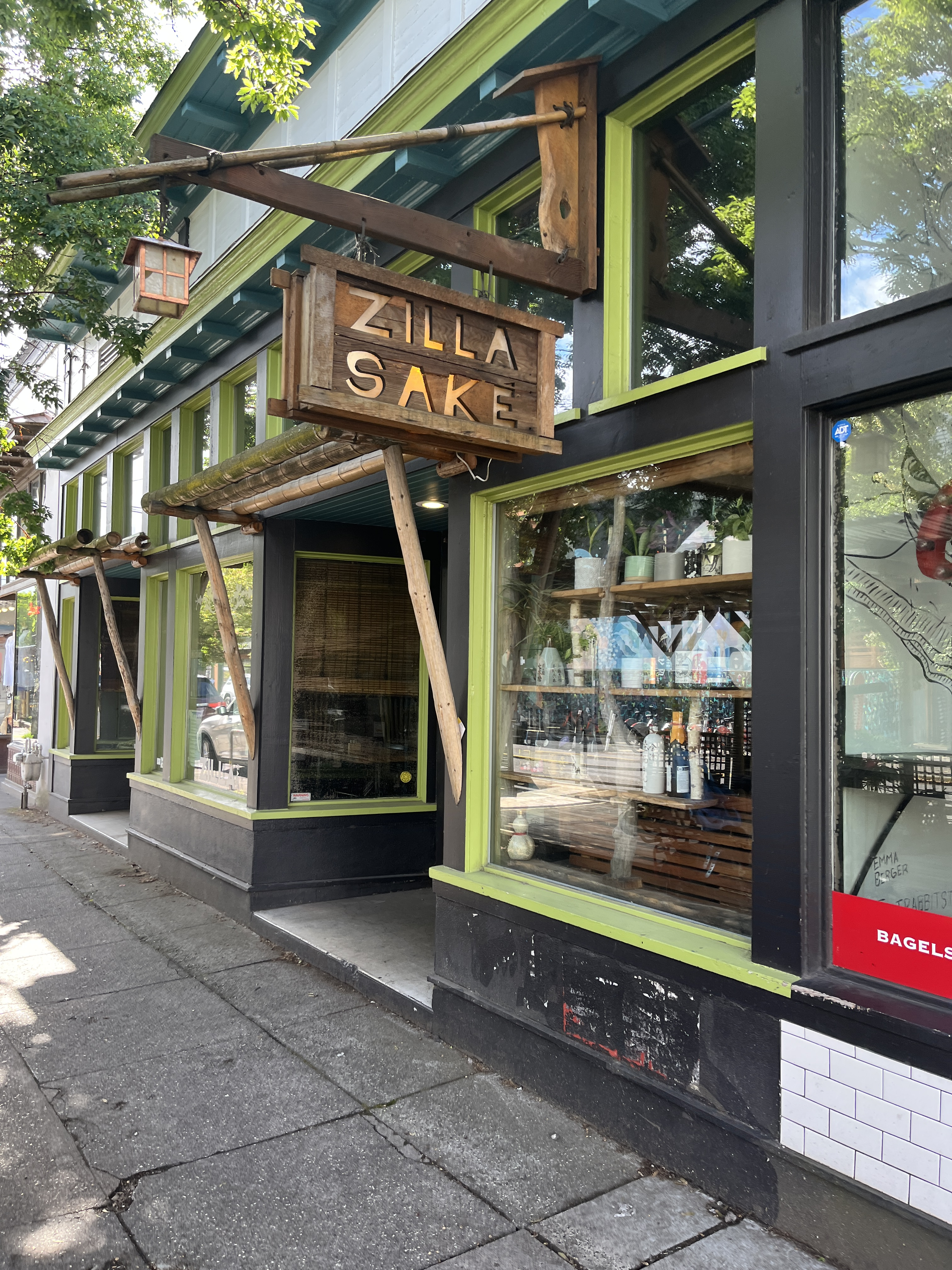
- The restaurant's exterior, 2026
- Interactive map of Zilla Sake

Restaurant information
- Food type: Japanese
- Location: 1806 Northeast Alberta Street, Portland, Multnomah, Oregon, 97211, United States
- Coordinates: 45.5590°N 122.6466°W

Zilla Sake is a Japanese restaurant in Portland, Oregon, United States.

== Description ==
The Japanese restaurant Zilla Sake operates on Alberta Street in northeast Portland's Vernon neighborhood. It is gluten-free and serves sushi and other seafood. Some products are sourced from Hawaii and Tokyo.

== History ==
In 2016, Zilla Sake launched a breakfast menu with options like egg, fish, rice, and vegetables. The restaurant expanded in 2017. Chef Kate Koo has been the owner since 2018.

As of 2017–2019, Zilla Sake had approximately 80–100 types of sake. The collection is the largest in Portland, as well as one of the largest in the Pacific Northwest and possibly the West Coast.

== Reception ==
Seiji Nanbu included Zilla Sake in Eater Portland's 2019 list of ten "unbelievable" chirashi bowls in the city, and in a 2024 overview of "knockout" sushi restaurants in the metropolitan area. In the website's 2024 overview of Portland's "knockout" gluten-free restaurants and bakeries, Sararosa Davies wrote, "This Alberta sake bar isn't just one of the city's best sushi restaurants; it's also one of the city's finest gluten-free restaurants." Rebecca Roland, Brooke Jackson-Glidden, and Nathan Williams recommended Zilla Sake in the website's 2024 list of restaurants on Alberta Street. Davies also included Zilla Sake in Eater Portland's 2025 overview of the city's best gluten-free restaurants and bakeries.

== See also ==
- History of Japanese Americans in Portland, Oregon
- List of Japanese restaurants
