= Portland Japanese School =

Japanese school in Portland area, Oregon, USA

- ポートランド日本人学校

Location
- Approximate location of the administrative office
- 10700 SW Beaverton–Hillsdale Highway, Suite 600; Beaverton, Oregon, 97005; United States; 45.4845°N 122.7876°W

Information
- Type: Japanese supplementary school
- Established: August 1971
- Grades: Kindergarten–12
- Affiliation: Japanese Business Association of Portland
- Website: pjs.shokookai.org

Portland Japanese School (PJS; ポートランド日本人学校 Pōtorando Nihonjin Gakkō) is a Japanese weekend supplementary school located in the Portland metropolitan area. The school has its office in Park Plaza West in Beaverton, and its classes are held at Hazelbrook Middle School in Tualatin. The Japanese Business Association of Portland (ポートランド日本人商工会 Pōtorando Nihonjin Shōkōkai), also known as the "Shokookai," oversees the school, which serves levels PK through 12.

== History ==
It was founded in August 1971. During the 1980s the school was meeting in Twality Middle School in Tigard as the PJS began its relationship with the Tigard-Tualatin School District. When Hazelbrook Middle School opened in 1992 the Japanese school moved its classes there. In 2000 the school had about 280 students.

== Curriculum and operations ==
The school teaches kokugo (Japanese language) and mathematics.

Every summer the Japanese school sends some Tigard-Tualatin school employees to Japan so they can study Japanese culture.

== Student demographics ==
As of 2011 the school had 363 students. Students originate from the Portland area, with a portion coming from Salem, Oregon and Longview, Washington. Many of their parents are businesspersons temporarily residing in the United States.

== See also ==
- Japanese language education in the United States
