= Buckman, Portland, Oregon =

Buckman
- Neighborhood
- Interactive map of Buckman
- Coordinates: 45°31′05″N 122°39′13″Wmap
- Country: United States
- State: Oregon
- City: Portland

Government
  - Association: Buckman Community Association
  - Coalition: Southeast Uplift

Area
  - Total: 1.15 sq mi (2.99 km^{2})

Population (2020)
  - Total: 11,151
  - Density: 9,660/sq mi (3,730/km^{2})

Housing
  - No. of households: 6456
  - Vacancy rate: 8.3%
  - Homeownership rate: 12%
  - Avg. household size: 1.7 persons

Buckman is a neighborhood in the Southeast section (and a small portion of the Northeast section) of Portland, Oregon. The neighborhood is bounded by the Willamette River on the west, E Burnside St. on the north (except for a triangle between NE 12th Ave. and NE 14th Ave. in which NE Sandy Blvd. forms the northern border), SE 28th Ave. on the east, and SE Hawthorne Blvd. on the south.

Schools in the neighborhood include Buckman Arts Magnet Elementary School (part of Portland Public Schools) and Central Catholic High School.

The neighborhood is named for late 19th century orchardist, and school board and city council member, Cyrus Buckman. In the 19th century the neighborhood was the center of the City of East Portland before it merged with the City of Portland on the west bank of the Willamette River. Today, the historic center of East Portland is designated as the East Portland Grand Avenue Historic District. The former Washington High School, built in 1924, is also in Buckman. Buckman is home to Ota Tofu, which has been described as the oldest existing tofu shop in the United States.

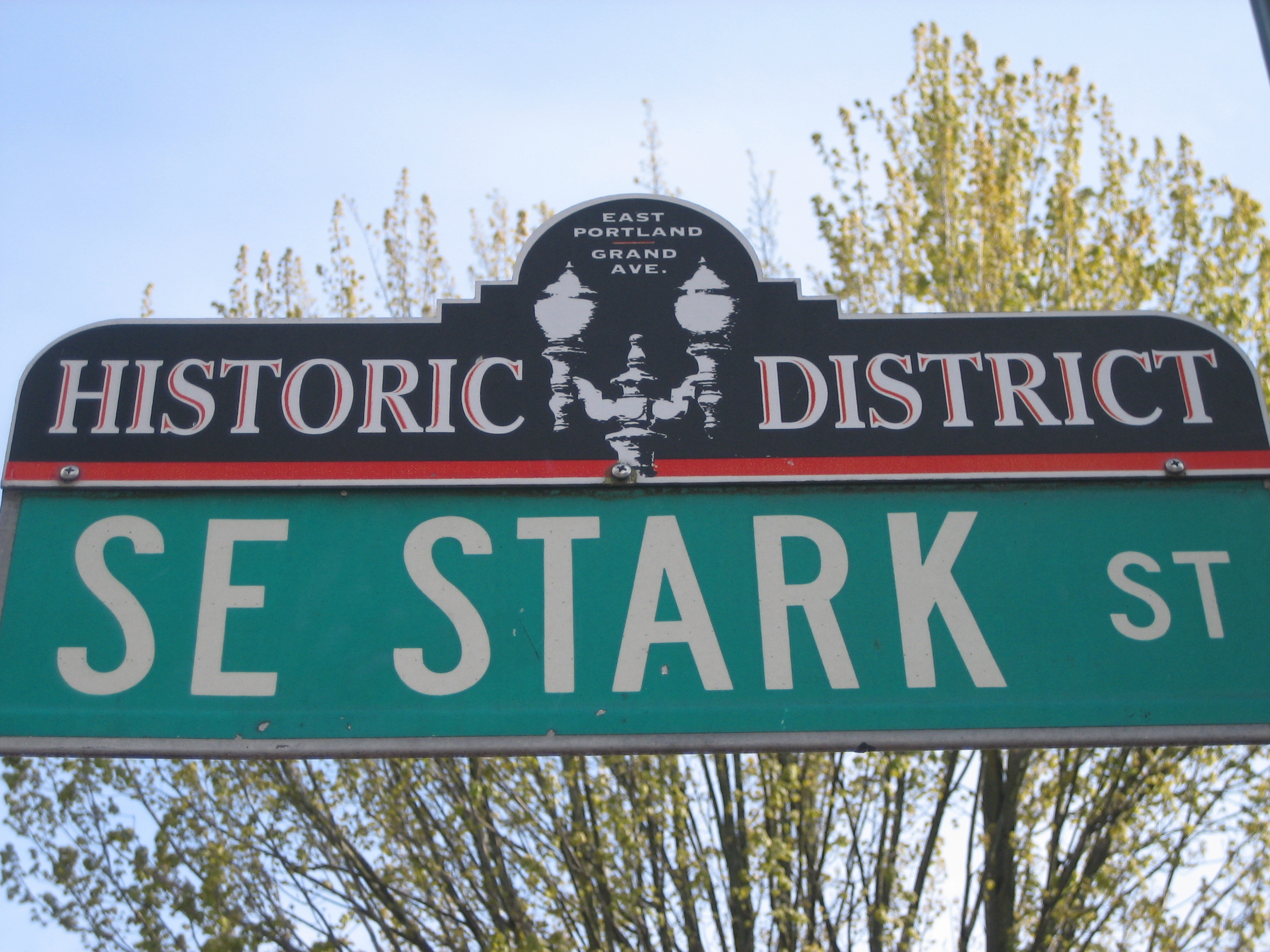
East Portland-Grand Ave Historic District street sign topper in the Buckman neighborhood, 2011

Three bridges connect Buckman to neighborhoods in Southwest Portland across the Willamette: the Old Town Chinatown neighborhood via the Burnside Bridge, and Downtown Portland via the Morrison and Hawthorne Bridges.

Two retail districts lie partially within Buckman: the Belmont District and the Hawthorne District.

The neighborhood also includes Lone Fir Cemetery (1855), Colonel Summers Park (1921), Buckman Community Garden (1980), and much of the Vera Katz Eastbank Esplanade (opened 2001).
