= Ainu and Native American power boards =

Public artworks in Portland, Oregon, U.S.

- The two planks in February 2021
- Medium: Wood sculpture
- Location: Portland, Oregon, U.S.; 45°31′36.1″N 122°39′43.3″W

The Ainu and Native American power boards are two hand carved wooden planks by members of Ainu and Chinook tribes, installed outside the Oregon Convention Center in Portland, Oregon. The pieces were commissioned for Forest of Dreams and exhibited at the Portland Japanese Garden before being erected in the Lloyd Center in 2019.
