= Broadway (Portland, Oregon) =

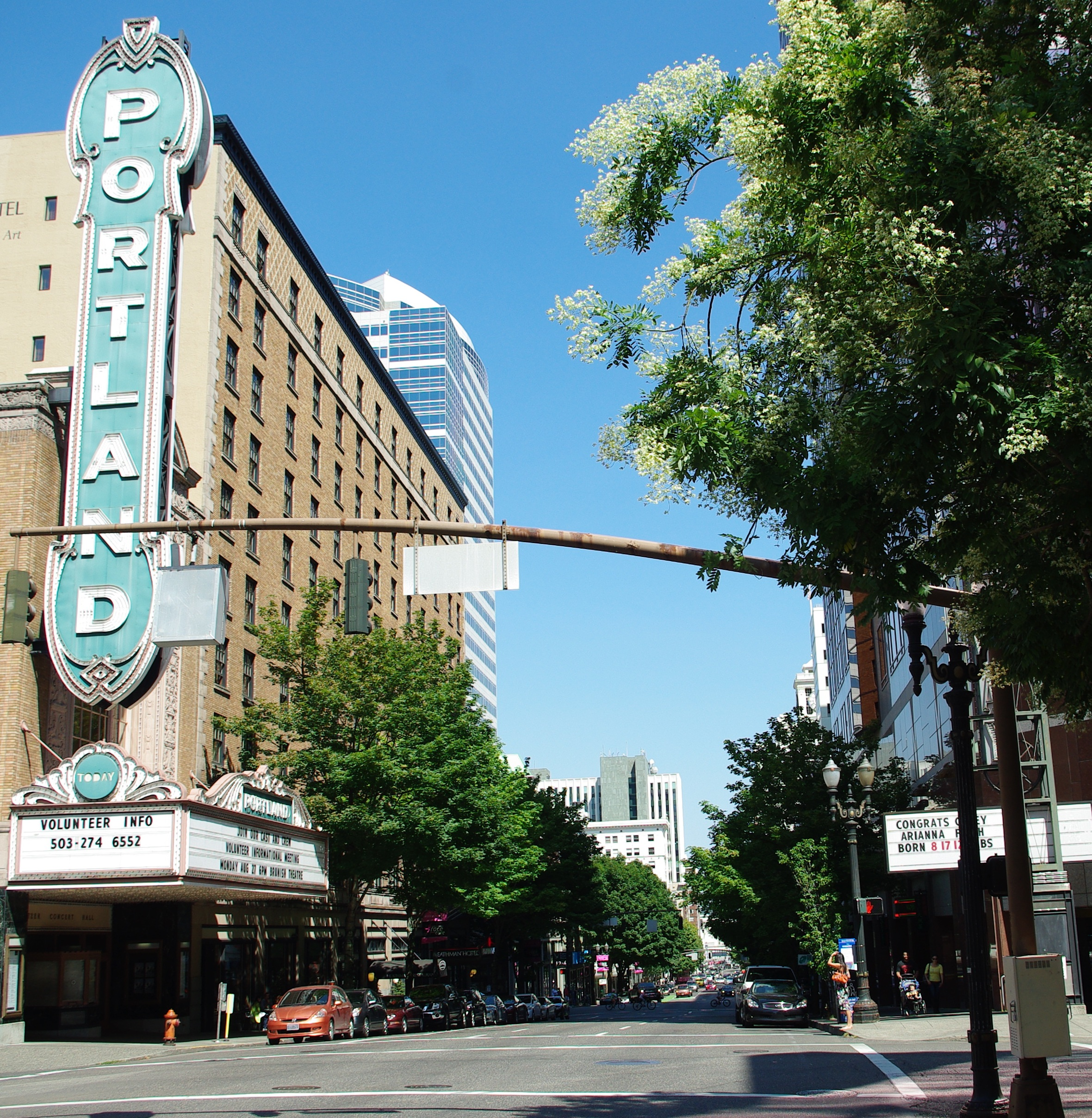
- Broadway in Downtown looking north at Main Street
- Location: Portland, Oregon

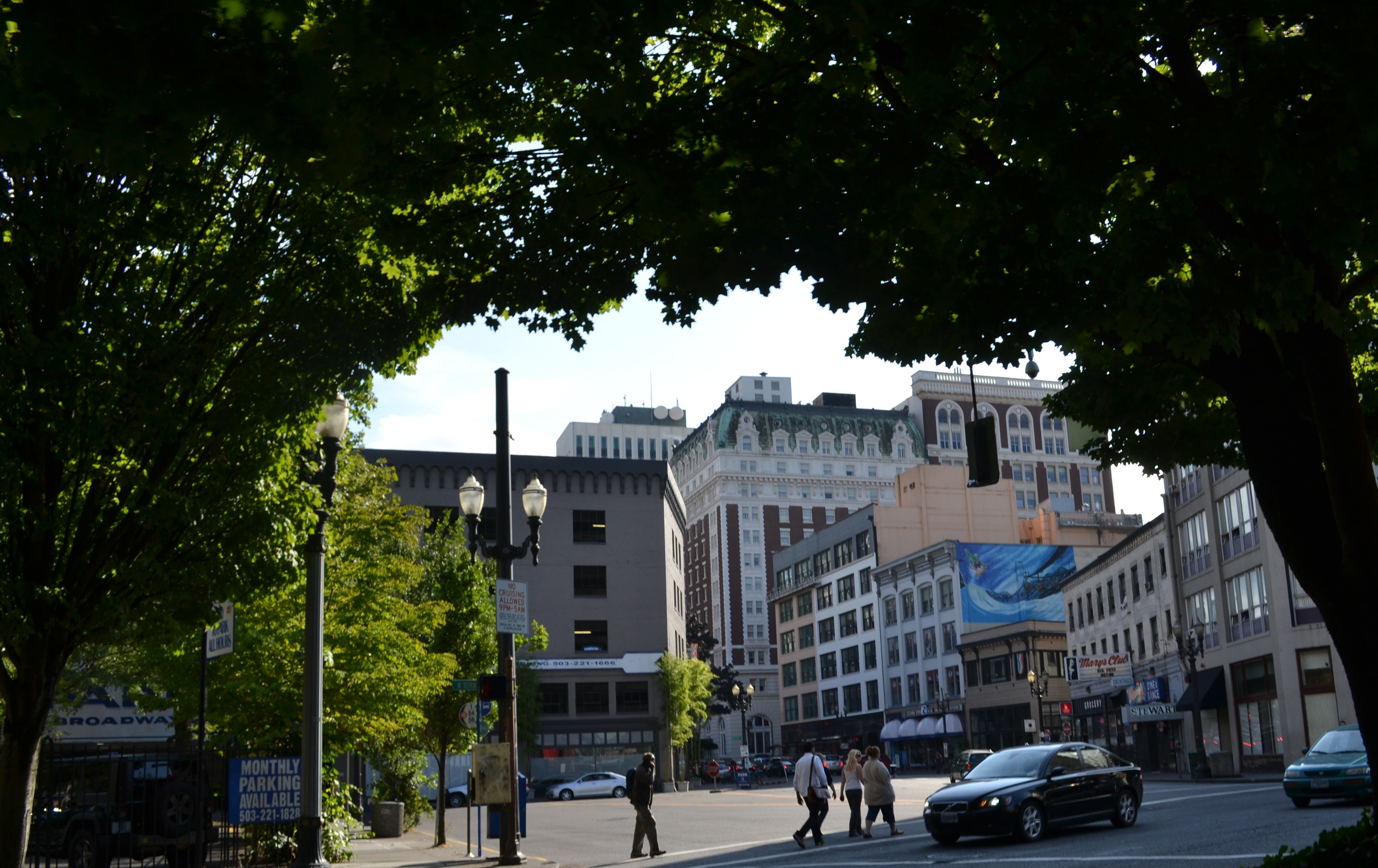
From West Burnside Street, looking southwest down Broadway

Broadway is a street in Portland, Oregon, that runs from the Southwest Hills into the Rose City Park area of Portland. It is north-south in Downtown Portland, crosses the Willamette River over the Broadway Bridge, and is east-west on the east side of the river. The Memorial Coliseum and Lloyd Center are located on or near Broadway. Many old movie theaters are on Broadway in the Hollywood District. The street also runs through historic Irvington and Sullivan's Gulch. Portland State University is also located on Broadway.

The section west of the Willamette was the most vibrant street in downtown Portland even before it was renamed, in 1913, from 7th Street to Broadway, and this continued for decades. During the day, it was a bustling shopping street, and remains a busy shopping street today. The street hosted several movie theaters and vaudeville playhouses, and at night their many neon signs and lighted marquees gave the area a look that was similar to Manhattan's more-famous Broadway. Almost all of the movie theaters have since closed, most in the 1960s and 1970s, but the street remains the center of downtown's nightlife. Theaters still located on Broadway in downtown include the Arlene Schnitzer Concert Hall (in a former Paramount Theatre) and the Antoinette Hatfield Hall.

Over a dozen buildings on Broadway are listed on the National Register of Historic Places, but the street is meant to be a busy and commercial, and to provide a route through which Portlanders could commute. Due to an advanced lighting system installed in 1925, it was once called "the brightest street in the world."

== Transit ==
In downtown, Broadway is parallel to, and one block west of, the Portland Transit Mall. On the east side of the Willamette River, TriMet bus lines 17 and 77 serve Broadway, and the Portland Streetcar's B Loop follows Broadway from Grand Avenue to and across the Broadway Bridge, while the A Loop follows Broadway from the Broadway Bridge until it branches onto N Weidler Street.

== See also ==
- List of streets in Portland, Oregon
