= Restaurant week =

Restaurant Week is a promotional event that runs in a number of countries in which participating restaurants offer fixed-price meals over the period of a week. The events started in New York in the 1990s, with several cities, states and countries following.

== United States ==
=== New York ===
New York Restaurant Week, also known as NYC Restaurant Week, is an event held twice a year in which participating restaurants in New York City offer prix fixe lunches and dinners. At the finest restaurants, this can be a fraction of the usual prices. The event is held in early winter (January/February) and summer (June/July). Since its inception, Restaurant Week has seen an increase in appreciation, followers, and footfalls to such an extent that it has inspired people to create their own version of the event in various cities across the globe.

Restaurant Week began as a lunch-only promotional event in 1992 and is considered the first "restaurant week" and the price was the year $19.92 (equivalent to $45 in 2024). Tim Zagat and Joe Baum are credited for the "first restaurant week". Tim Zagat in a 2010 The Atlantic article said that he did not see or dream of the possibility of using American Express and Coca-Cola as sponsors for future events at the time.

A letter to the editor of The New York Times was published on July 15, 1992. In the letter, Emil William Chynn praised the organization of the first "restaurant week" during the Democratic National Convention, and he suggested that it becomes a yearly event with sponsors like Coca-Cola and American Express.

Restaurant Week celebrated its 25th anniversary in 2017, The program continues twice a year as of 2025.

=== Chicago ===
Chicago Restaurant Week, is an event held once a year for seventeen days in which participating restaurants in Chicago offer prix fixe lunches and dinners. A celebration of Chicago's culinary scene featuring some of the finest restaurants, this can be a fraction of the usual prices. The event is held in early winter (January). Chicago Restaurant Week has been hosted for 16 years as of January 2023.

Chicago Restaurant Week began as a celebration of the city's award-winning culinary scene. The event brought together the city's top restaurants, representing a near-endless array of cuisines. Tim Zagat and Joe Baum are credited for the "first restaurant week". Tim Zagat in a 2010 The Atlantic article said that he did not see or dream of the possibility of using American Express and Coca-Cola as sponsors for future events at the time.

Chicago Restaurant Week celebrated its 16th anniversary in 2023, The program continues annually as of 2023.

=== Los Angeles ===
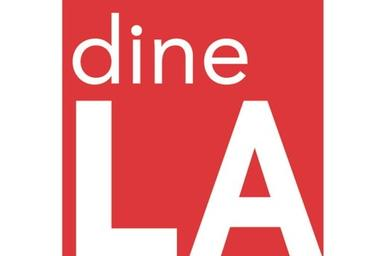
dineLA logo

DineLA Restaurant Week is a consecutive 12-day event that usually takes place twice a year. Hundreds of fine dining restaurants in Los Angeles, California, participate with prix fixe menus for reduced prices. The event promotes all the levels of fine dining and different ethnic palettes.

DineLA is a marketing association run by the Los Angeles Tourism and Convention Board and American Express, created to promote Los Angeles as a prime dining location. First introduced to Los Angeles County in January 2008, dineLA's Restaurant Week had over 140 different restaurants. In 2014, dineLA's Restaurant Week partnered with over 300 restaurants from all over the county. It allowed diners to explore new choices and dine at otherwise unaffordable places for lower than normal prices. However, participating restaurants sometimes offered limited menus or simpler dishes than normal.

Starting in 2022, the Restaurant Week was organized in spring and fall. The Fall 2023 event had 350 participating restaurants.

Previous restaurant weeks include:

- January 27, 2008 – February 8, 2008
- January 21, 2009 – February 1, 2009
- October 4, 2009 – October 16, 2009
- January 24, 2010 – February 5, 2010
- October 3, 2010 – October 15, 2010
- January 23, 2011 – February 4, 2011
- October 2, 2011 – October 14, 2011
- January 22, 2012 – Feb 3, 2012
- July 16, 2012 – July 27, 2012
- January 21, 2013 – February 1, 2013
- July 15, 2013 – July 26, 2013
- January 20, 2014 – January 31, 2014
- January 18, 2016 – January 31, 2016
- January 12, 2018 – January 26, 2018
- April 28, 2023 – May 12, 2023
- October 6, 2023 – October 20, 2023
- July 12, 2024 – July 26, 2024
- January 24, 2025 – February 7, 2025
- July 25, 2025 – August 8, 2025

== Brazil ==
São Paulo has been running events since 2012.
