= Quintonil =

Mexican restaurant in Mexico City, Mexico

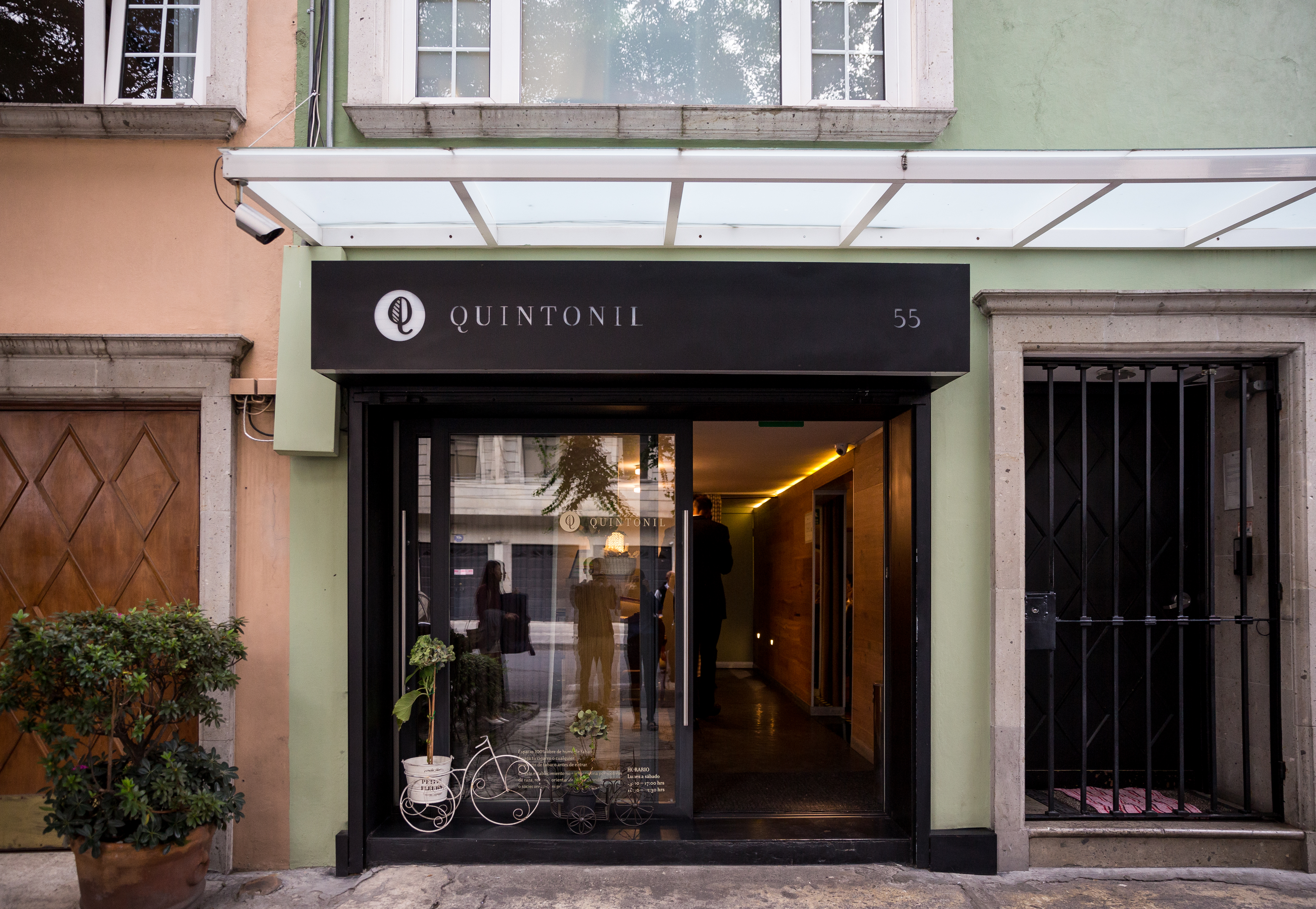
- The restaurant's entrance in 2016
- Interactive map of Quintonil

Restaurant information
- Established: 9 March 2012; 14 years ago
- Owners: Jorge Vallejo; Alejandra Flores
- Manager: Alejandra Flores
- Head chef: Jorge Vallejo
- Food type: Mexican
- Dress code: None
- Rating: (Michelin Guide, 2024–present)
- Location: Newton 55, Polanco, Miguel Hidalgo, Mexico City, 11550, Mexico
- Coordinates: 19°25′51″N 99°11′30″W
- Seating capacity: 42
- Reservations: Yes
- Other information: Nearest station: Polanco metro station
- Website: quintonil.com

Quintonil ([kin.toˈnil]) is a contemporary Mexican restaurant in Polanco, Mexico City, Mexico. It is owned by chef Jorge Vallejo and manager Alejandra Flores, a couple who met while working at Pujol in 2009. Two years later, they left to open a restaurant with a concept centered on "welcome customers and bid farewell to friends".

Quintonil opened in 2012 along Newton Street as a casual restaurant with a daily menu, operating with secondhand furniture and tableware. Over the years, the dishes evolved into fine dining. The restaurant is named after a species of Mexican amaranth and offers both à la carte options and a seasonal tasting menu prioritizing heirloom vegetables, native herbs, and insects, most of which are sourced from across the country.

Quintonil has received positive reviews from food critics along with several culinary accolades. It has appeared in the list of the World's 50 Best Restaurants since 2016, rising to number three in 2025, when it was named the best of North America. It also was awarded two Michelin stars in 2024, in the first Michelin Guide for Mexico, becoming the highest-rated restaurant in the country, alongside Pujol.

== Description ==
Quintonil serves both à la carte dishes and a nine-course tasting menu, which changes seasonally—for example, in July 2025, it focused primarily on asparagus, carrots, and mushrooms. The restaurant's menu features both traditional and unconventional Mexican ingredients, including beans, squash, various chiles, and mushrooms, as well as lesser-known elements such as quintonil, other heirloom vegetables and herbs, and insects. While most dishes are plant-based or insect-based, a few contain other proteins, such as beef, pork, or fish.

Quintonil sources its fruits and vegetables from Milpa Alta and Xochimilco in Mexico City and from the neighboring states of Hidalgo and the State of Mexico. Pork is procured from Michoacán and Yucatán, beef from Durango, and fish from Baja California. The restaurant's menu is "98% Mexican", according to the owner Jorge Vallejo, who said that only the caviar, an unspecified type of fish, and olive oil are imported. In 2024, Quintonil held an Entomophagy Festival, where insects were the main ingredient in several dishes.

Diners may also opt for a wine pairing at an additional cost. The beverage selection includes European wines alongside Mexican options, namely mezcal, local vintages, and craft beers. As of 2025, the restaurant offers four wine-pairing options: Wines of the World, Mexican Wines, Terroir & Rarities, and Champagne Experience. Quintonil owns two wine labels, including Alfalfa, made of Nero d'Avola grapes cultivated in Valle de Guadalupe, Baja California.

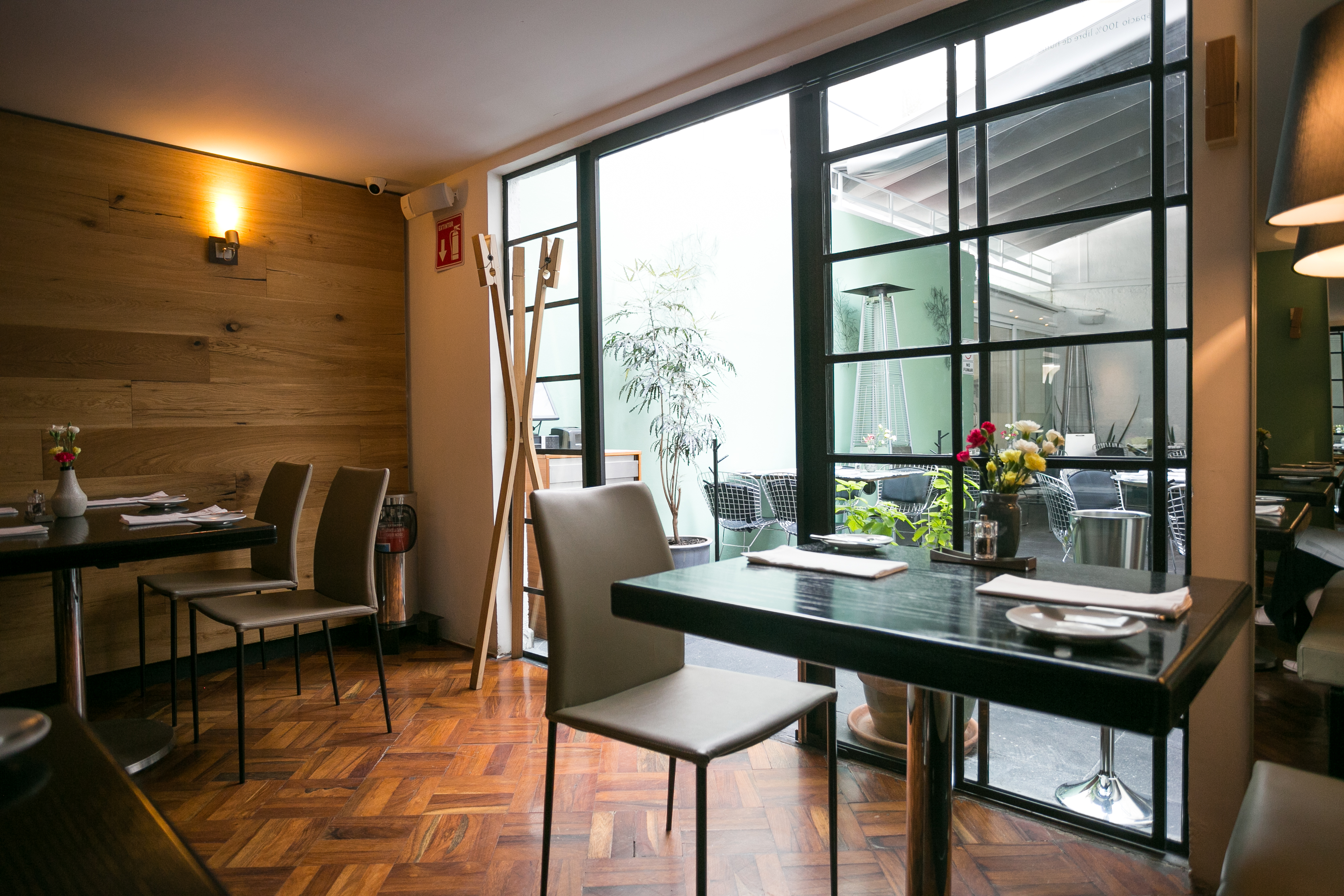
The dining rooms in 2013

Quintonil has drawn interest from foreign diners. Samir Tounsi of Agence France-Presse describes Quintonil's exterior as tucked "behind a faded window and a simple curtain". Inside, past the reception area, are two small, windowless dining rooms next to a countertop overlooking the kitchen. Together, they hold about a dozen tables. The restaurant has volcanic stone floors and walls clad in wood and mirrors. Vallejo and Flores bought their plates at an outlet in Austin, Texas; the chairs were purchased from Pujol, and the tables were custom-made by craftspeople on Mexican Federal Highway 15.

Quintonil is located near Polanco metro station. It seats 42 guests, requires reservations, and has no mandatory dress code. As of 2025, it employed 60 people.

== History ==
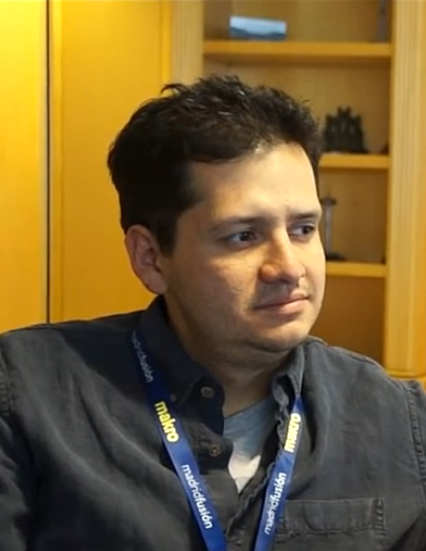
Vallejo in 2016. He opened Quintonil to highlight Mexican cuisine using traditional ingredients over international fare

After dropping out of high school, Vallejo studied gastronomy at the Centro Culinario Ambrosía. He later trained at Noma in Copenhagen, Denmark. In 2009, while working at Pujol in Mexico City's Polanco neighborhood, he met manager Alejandra Flores. The couple began dating and left Pujol in 2011 to open their own restaurant with a "family concept": a place, they said, to "welcome customers and bid farewell to friends".

They named the restaurant after quintonil, a type of amaranth, chosen for both "its sound and its connotation". The word comes from the Nahuatl language and means "edible weed". The restaurant was opened on Newton Street in Polanco on 9 March 2012, using a small loan as their starting budget.

Vallejo explained that his goal in opening Quintonil was to create a diner that showcased Mexican cuisine at a time when most similar dining options were focused on international food, giving preference to traditional ingredients including nopal, quintonil, and huauzontle. He explained that some of his dishes use such ingredients that mainstream restaurants often overlook. These are frequently seen as food associated with poverty, yet they remain an integral part of the Mexican culture and heritage. At the same time, the place needed to stand out from other local Mexican eateries, so Vallejo refined the restaurant's concept.

Quintonil began as a fonda serving an affordable daily menu but gradually evolved into a fine dining restaurant. In an interview, Vallejo stated that he made the change to secure the best quality ingredients. Although this made the menu pricier, he emphasized that the cost was justified by a superior experience, including products and service. He also described the change as a rethinking of food presentation.

For Quintonil's tenth anniversary in 2022, Vallejo and Flores invited international chefs, including Julien Royer, to help reinvent the restaurant's signature recipes and develop new dishes.

== Reception and recognition ==
Tiffany Yannetta of The Infatuation recommended the tasting menu, calling it "entertaining" and highlighting the Entomophagy Festival, suggesting diners try experimental dishes, such as bluefin tuna with frozen wasabi powder. Adrián Duchateau wrote in Afar that Quintonil incorporates local vegetables and herb varieties within a broader focus on sustainability-oriented cuisine. Scarlett Lindeman described it as part of the new wave of Mexican cuisine, and identified it as an alternative fine-dining destination in Mexico City to Pujol.

Alexandra Carlton, writing for Gourmet Traveller, recounted that upon tasting the first dish, chileatole—a soup made from corn masa—her eyes widened in surprise, like "a cartoon mouse catching sight of a cat". She expressed that although the bowl used humble, simple ingredients, it delivered notably complex flavors. Reviewing for the same magazine, Pat Nourse commended the huitlacoche preparation, noting that it initially resembled chewed gum but was elevated by a combination with seaweed, concluding, "the thinking is fresh, but the flavors remain honest".

Christine Muhlke, editor-at-large of Bon Appétit, considered the menu an unpretentious, "joyful journey through Mexico". Another writer for the magazine encouraged the reader to try unfamiliar ingredients and dishes, such as "cactus, tamales, mole, and escamoles". Leslie Yeh of Lifestyle Asia praised both the ingredients and ambiance. In its 2019 list of the top 23 restaurants in Mexico City, Time Out ranked Quintonil ninth.

=== Awards ===
Quintonil was named Best New Restaurant in the 2012 Gourmet Awards by the Mexican edition of Travel + Leisure and received the magazine's award for Best Tasting Menu the following year.

Quintonil has ranked on the World's 50 Best Restaurants list. It ranked number 3 in 2025, 4 in 2026, 7 in 2024, 9 in 2022 and 2023, 11 in 2018, 12 in 2016, 22 in 2017, 24 in 2019, and 27 in 2021. No list was published in 2020 due to the impact of the COVID-19 pandemic on the food industry. In 2022, Vallejo received the Estrella Damm Chefs' Choice Award from the same company, the only award voted by other chefs. In the 2023 edition, the World's 50 Best Restaurants stated, "Quintonil is the setting for chef Jorge Vallejo's boundary-pushing Mexican cuisine and his wife Alejandra Flores' remarkable hospitality. Focused on fresh, local produce and traditional Mexican [flavors] and techniques weaved into modern preparations, it is fast becoming a classic."

Also in 2023, La Liste ranked Quintonil as the top Mexican restaurant, and it was voted the sixth best international restaurant by Food & Wine magazine readers. The Michelin Guide debuted in Mexico the following year and it awarded 18 restaurants with Michelin stars. Quintonil and Pujol received two stars each, meaning "excellent cooking, worth a detour", tying for the highest number of stars in the country. Regarding Quintonil, the guide added: "The elegant cuisine is an enticing melding of excellent local product, impressive execution, and great creativity to produce refined compositions."

Quintonil, along with six other Michelin-starred restaurants in Mexico City, was honored by Martí Batres, the head of the Mexico City government, with an onyx statuette in appreciation of their role in promoting tourism in the city. Quintonil received the Best Wine and Spirits Program award from the México Gastronómico guide, published by Larousse Cocina in 2025. The guide highlighted the restaurant's wine pairings, describing its beverage program as "meticulous" and "carefully thought out".

== Gallery ==
Example of a nine-course menu served in November 2013.

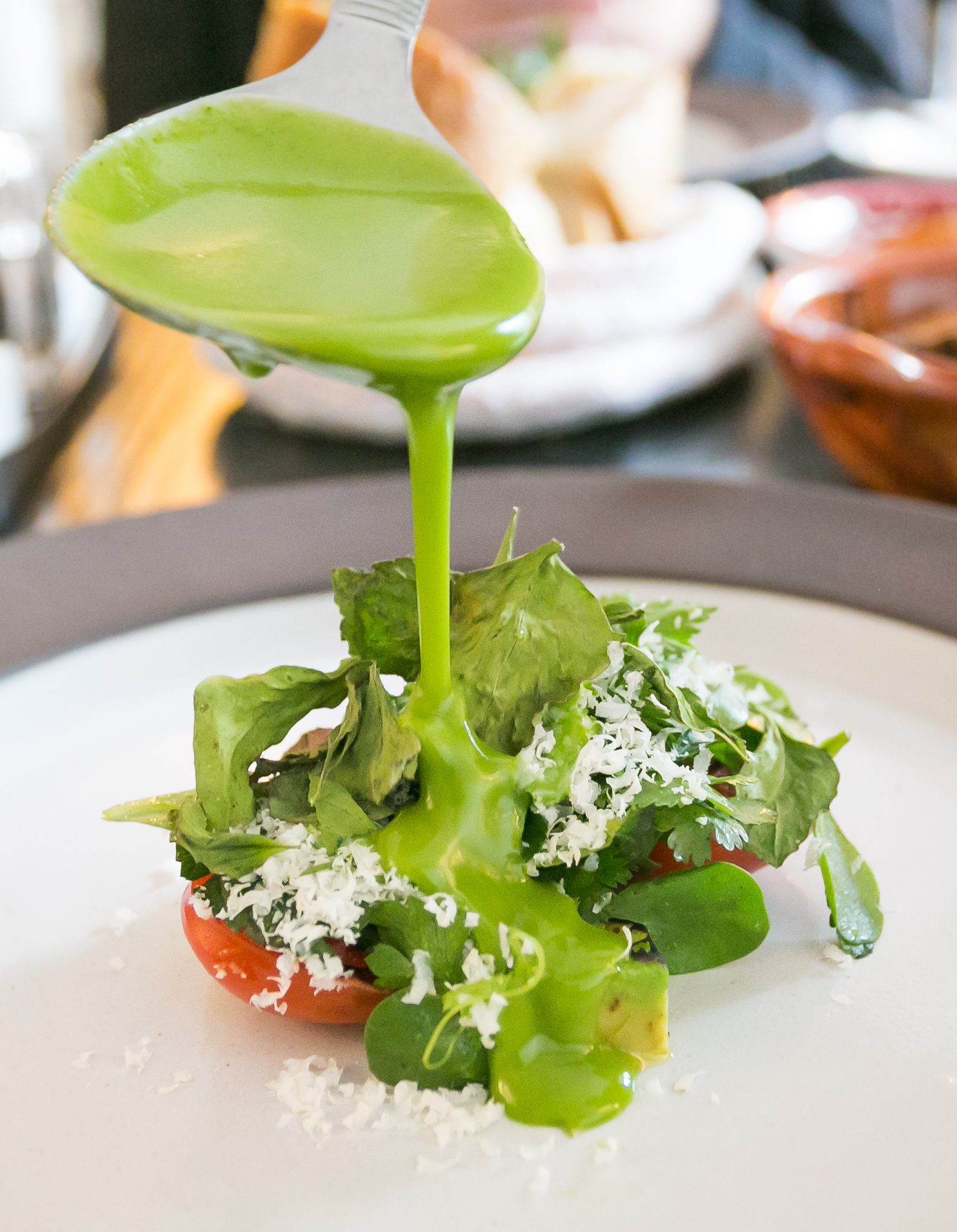
Lightly toasted Mexican herb salad with Cotija cheese and grilled tomatoes

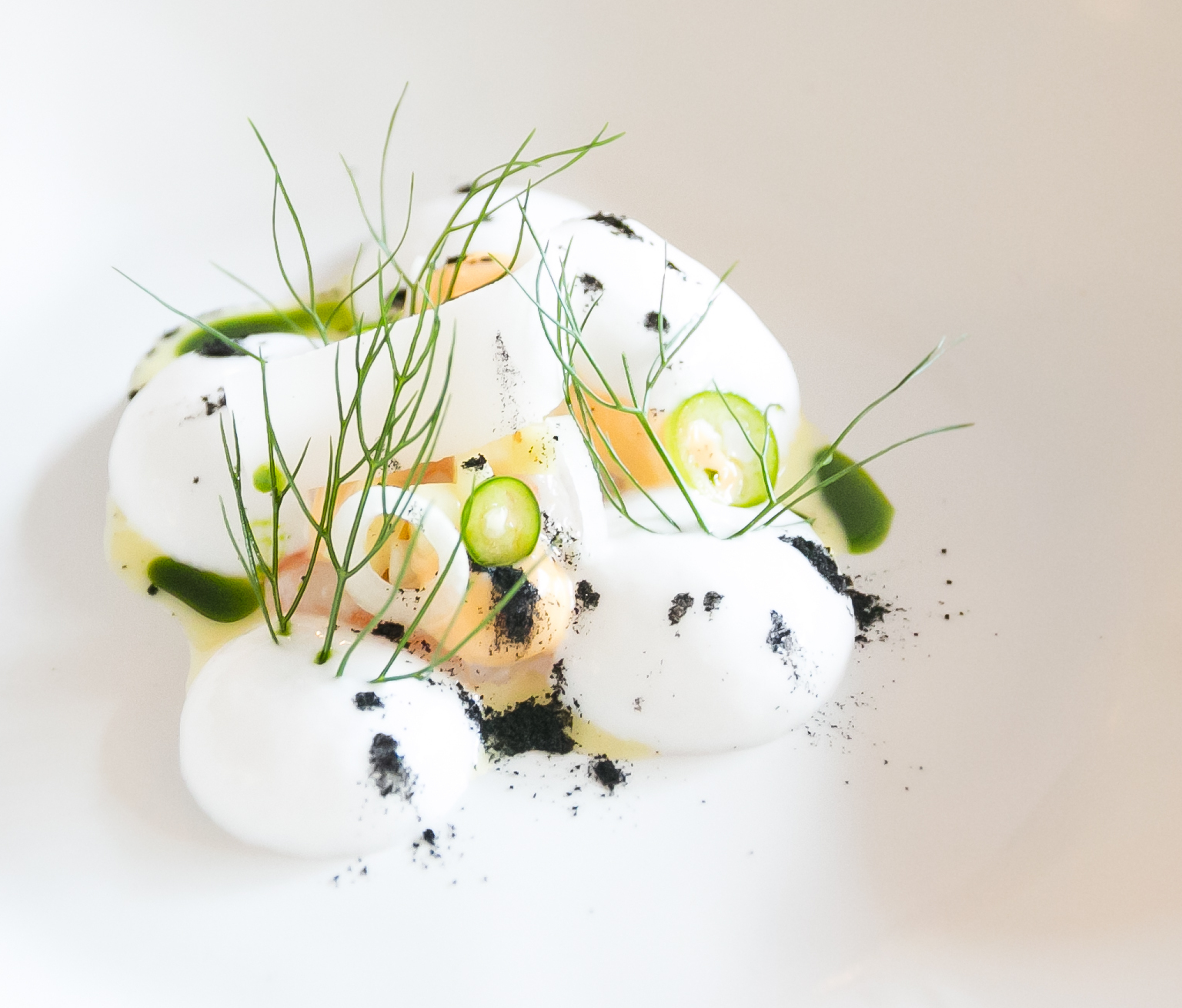
Shrimp cocktail with coconut and guava

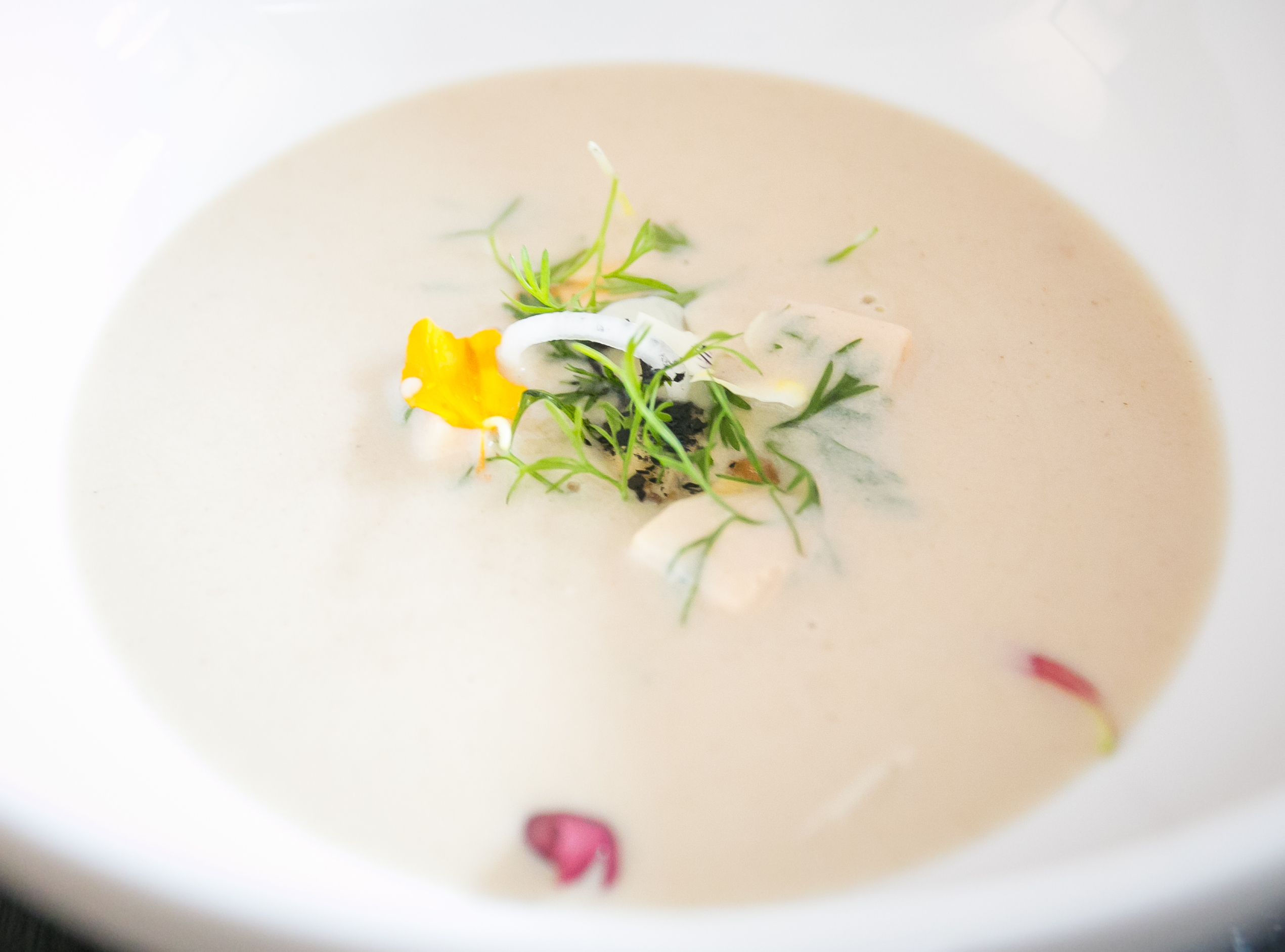
Oaxacan string cheese soup, fried pork belly, and plantain

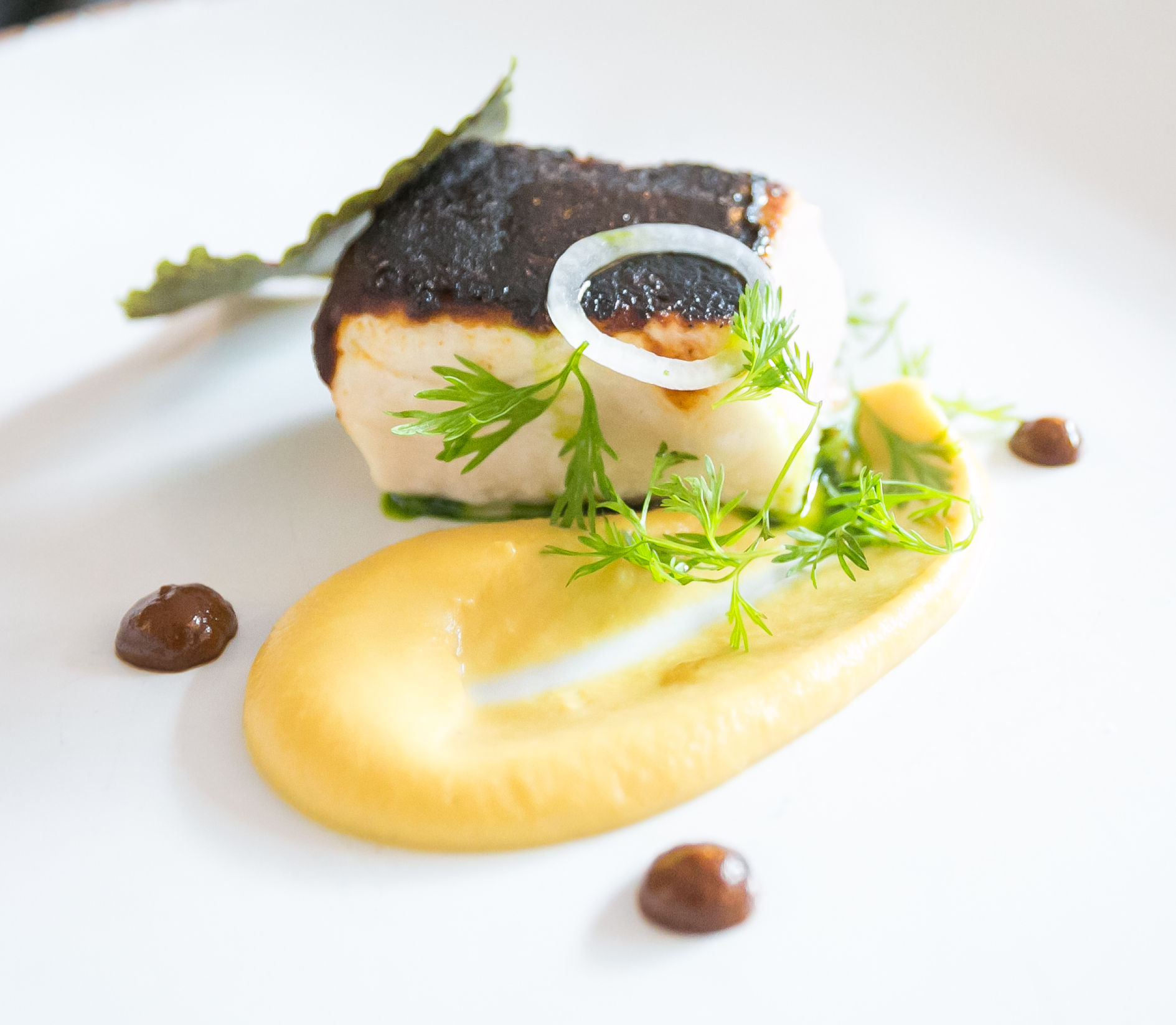
Catch of the day with burned chipotle chili, pumpkin, and pineapple purée, with coriander

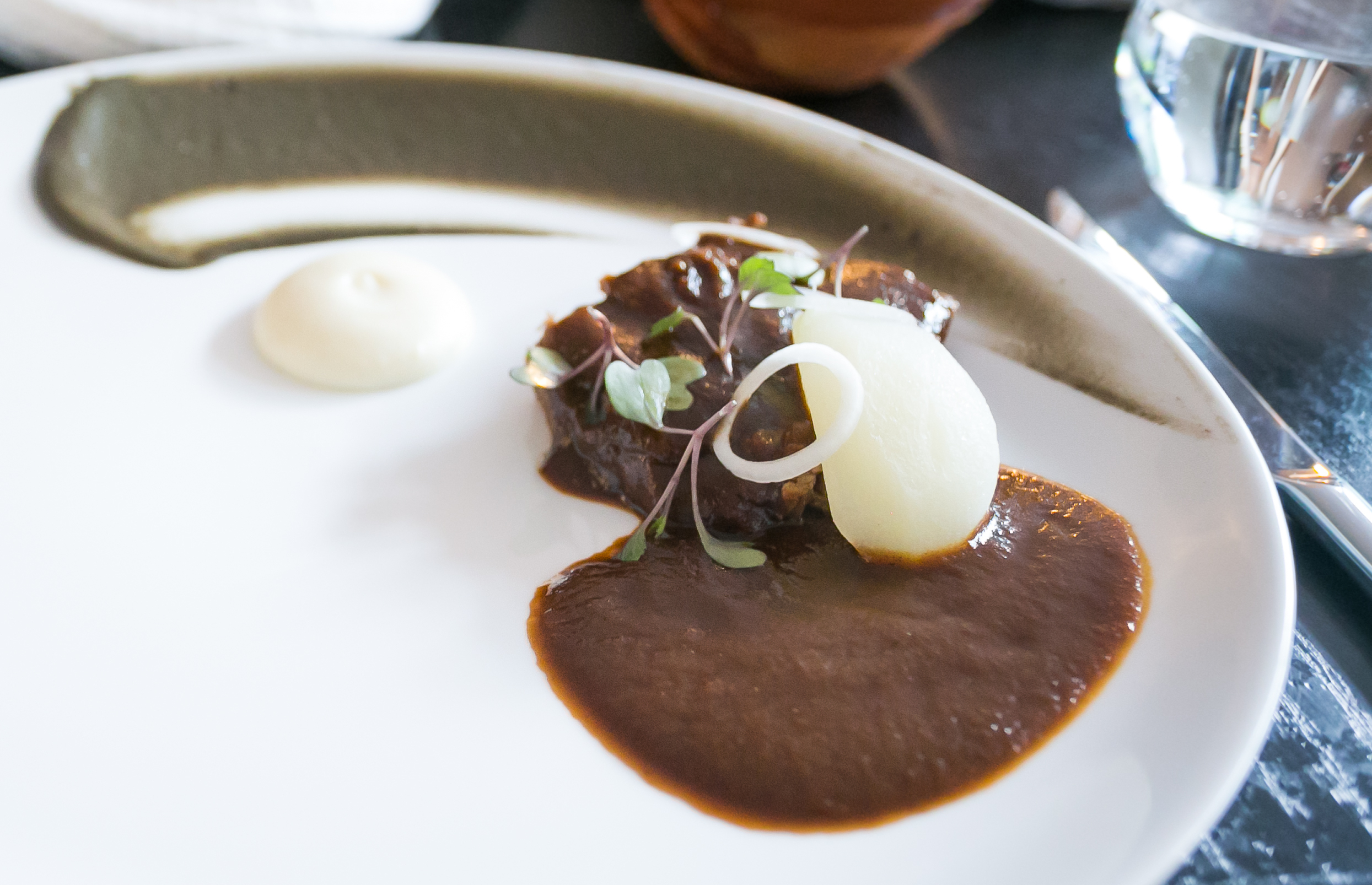
Braised brisket wagyu beef and pulque, corn and dried chili demi-glace

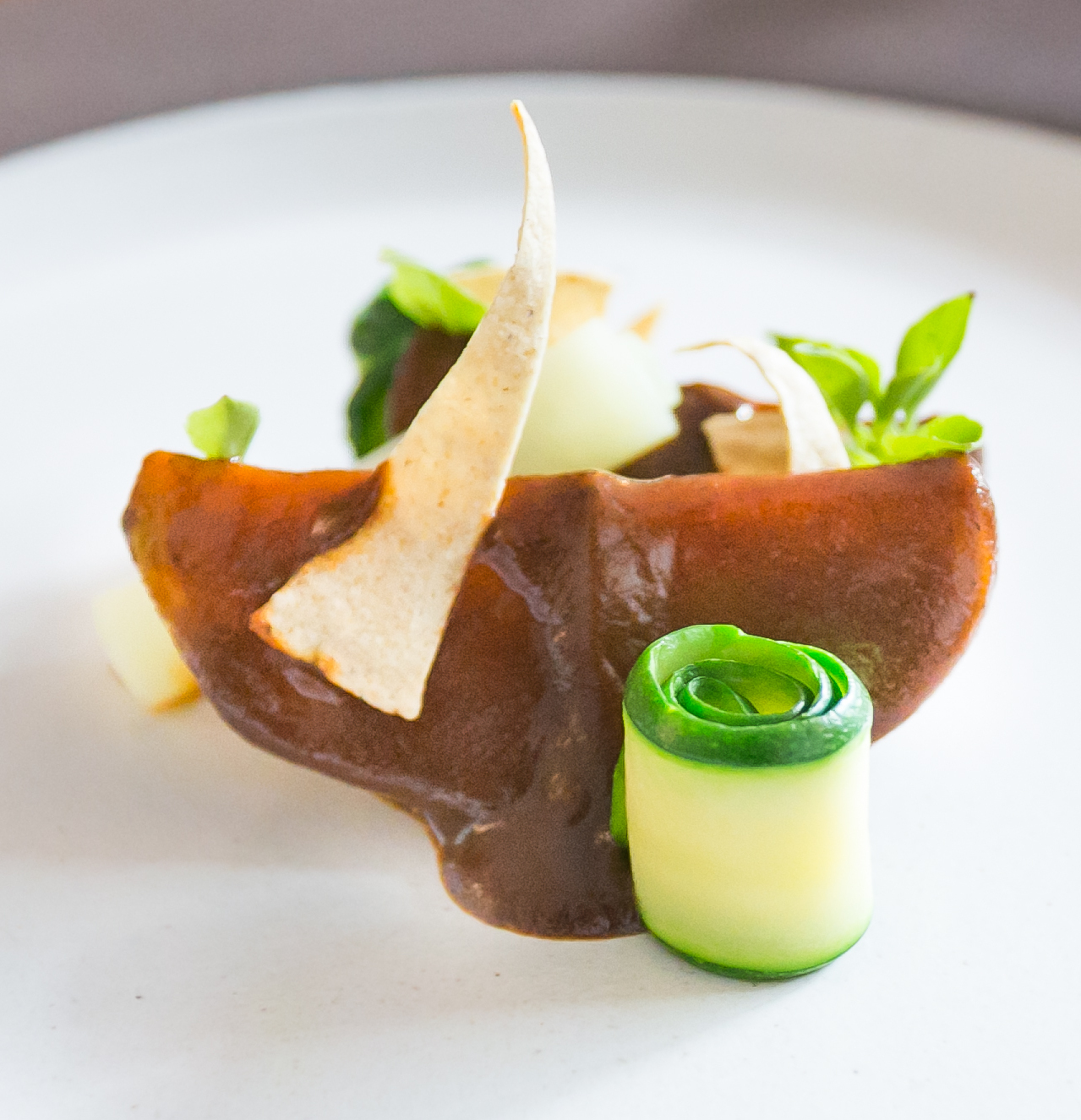
Chilacayote mole with charred tortilla and basil sprouts

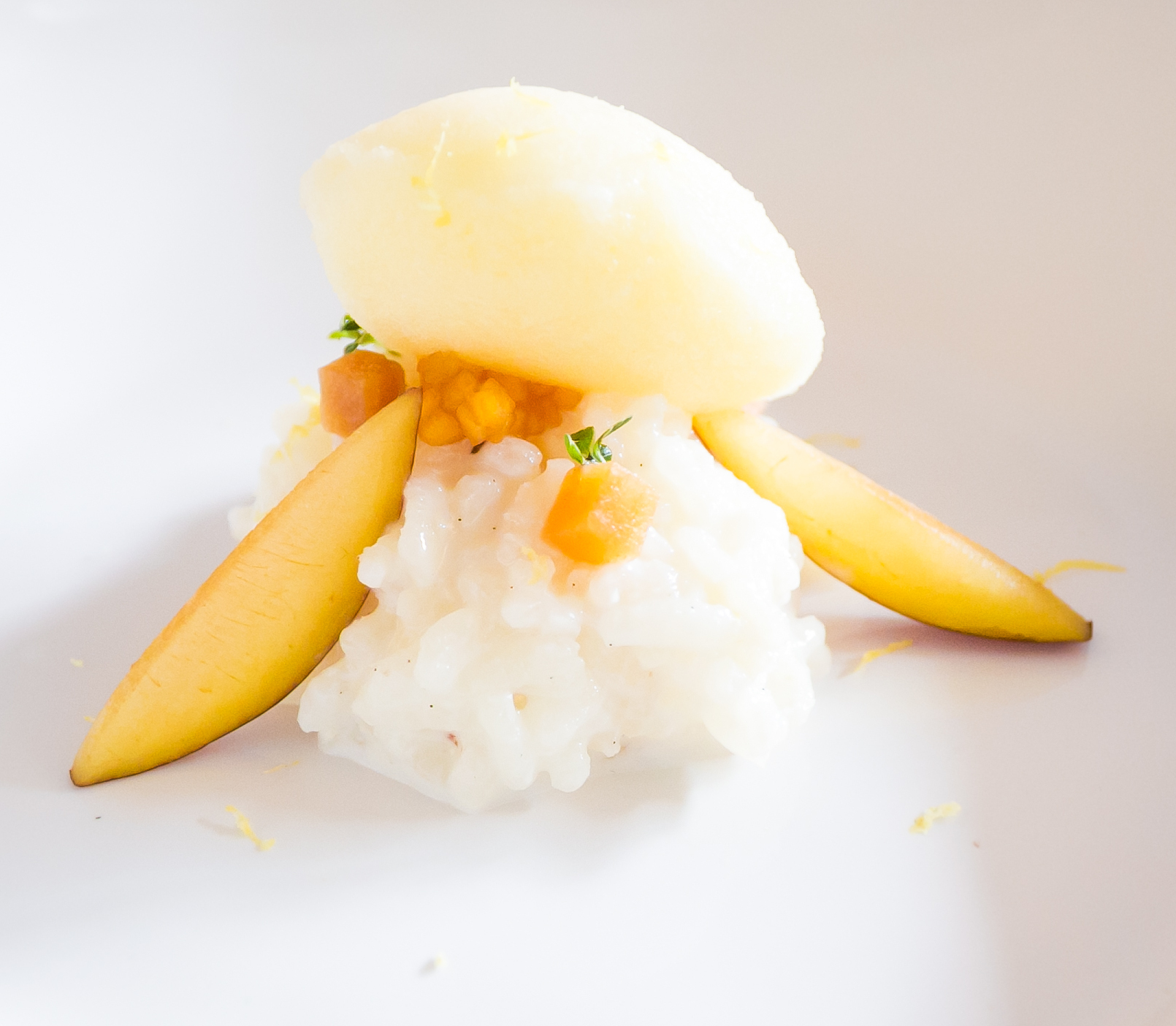
Vanilla rice pudding, seasonal plums, orange and thyme sorbet

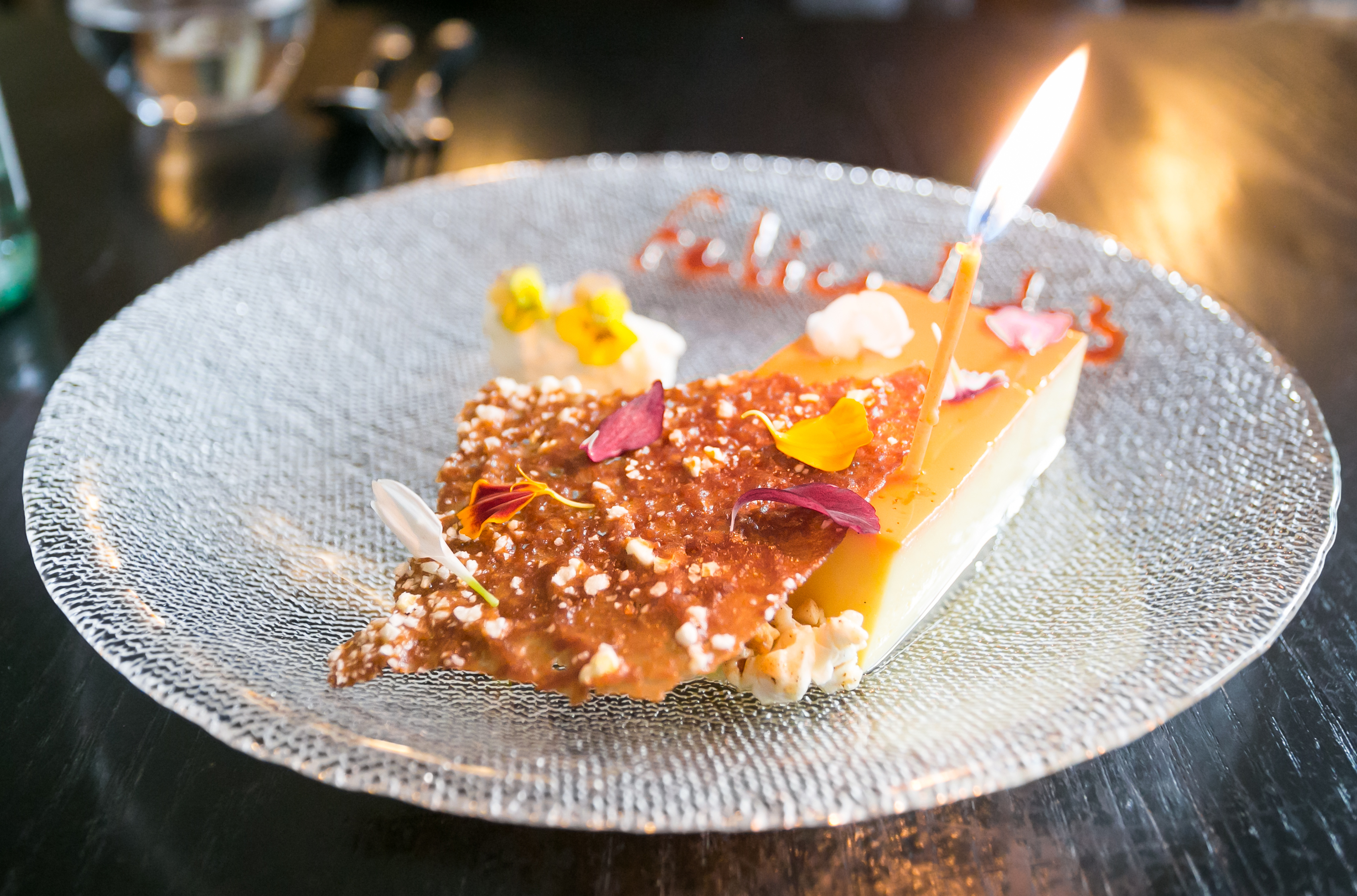
Flan

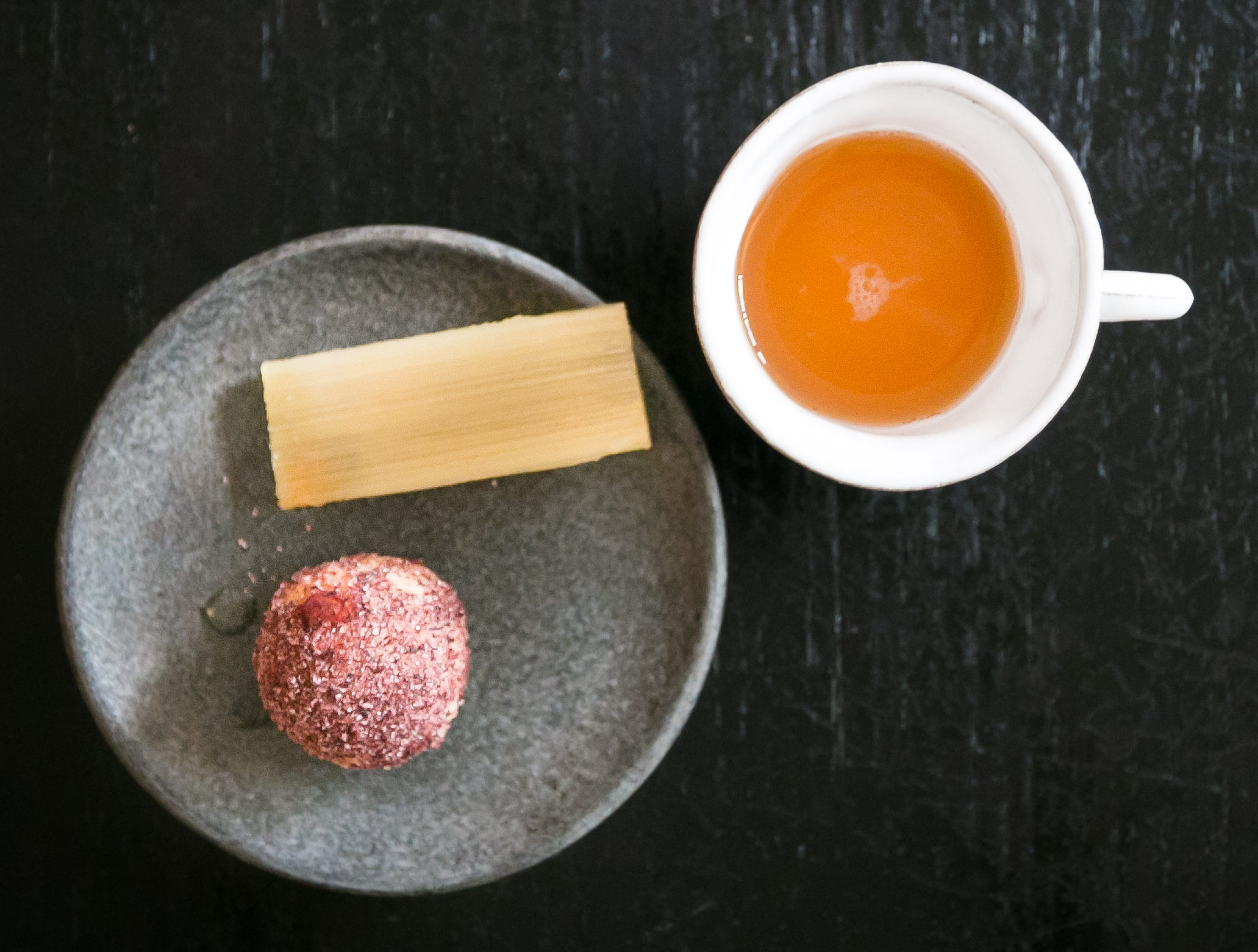
Guava ponche with cinnamon, bread with hibiscus sugar and crystallized orange, with a sugarcane

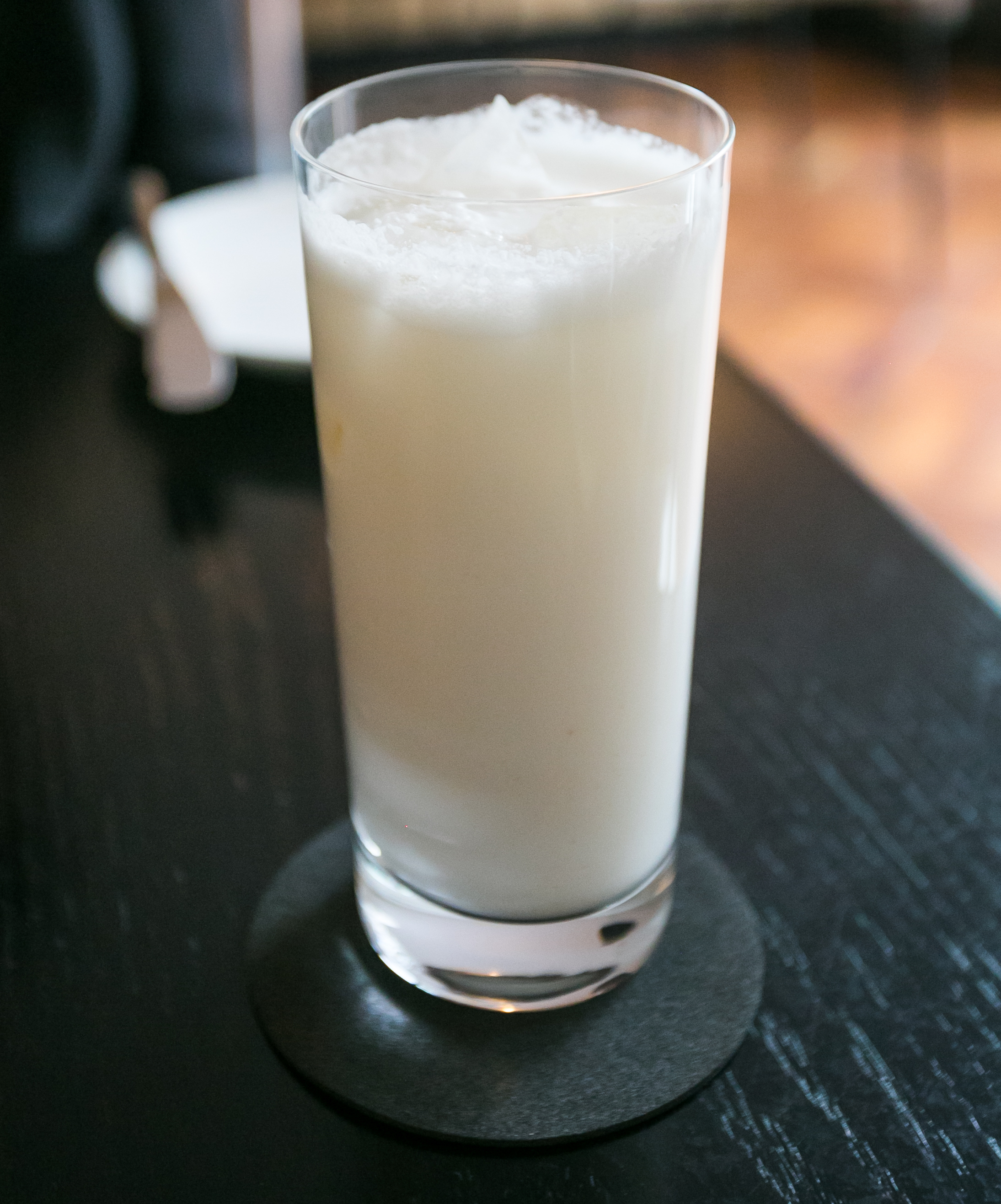
Coconut beverage

== See also ==
- List of Mexican restaurants
- List of Michelin-starred restaurants in Mexico
