= Bernardo Hernández =

Bernardo Hernández may refer to:

- Bernardo Hernández Blázquez, Spanish businessman, founder in the 1930s of the ham producer company BEHER
- Bernardo Hernández (footballer, born 1942), Mexican football forward
- Bernardo Hernández González (born 1970), Spanish technology entrepreneur and business angel
- Bernardo Hernández (footballer, born 1993), Mexican football left-back
