= Zagat =

Rating company

- Type: Private
- Industry: Restaurant reviews
- Founded: 1979 in New York City
- Founders: Tim and Nina Zagat
- Parent: JPMorgan Chase (2021–present) The Infatuation (2018–2021); Google (2011–2018)
- Website: zagat.com

The Zagat Survey (/zəˈɡæt/, zə-GAT), commonly referred to as Zagat (stylized in all caps), is an organization which collects and correlates the ratings of restaurants by diners, established by Tim and Nina Zagat in 1979. For their first guide, covering New York City, the Zagats surveyed their friends. At its height around 2005, the Zagat Survey included 70 cities, with reviews based on the input of 250,000 individuals with the guides reporting on and rating restaurants, hotels, nightlife, shopping, zoos, museums, music, movies, theaters, golf courses, and airlines. The guides are sold in book form, and were formerly only available as a paid subscription on the Zagat website.

As part of its more than $150 million acquisition by Google in September 2011, Zagat's offering of reviews and ratings became a part of Google's Geo and Commerce group, eventually to be tightly integrated into Google's services. Google relaunched Zagat's website on July 29, 2013, with an improved interface, but cut down the site from 30 cities to nine. They released a searchable database of reviews from the other 21 cities in the following days while they worked on expanding to include more cities in the new site. In December 2012, Google announced that it would lay off most former full-time Zagat employees that were previously extended as contractors at the time of the acquisition, leading to prophetic business reports describing the future of Zagat book production as bleak, and subsequent business news reports recording the contraction of their print businesses. Regardless, Google's acquisition and integration of Zagat provided it with a strong brand in local restaurant recommendations and ample content for location-based searches.

In March 2018, Google sold the company to restaurant discovery platform The Infatuation for an undisclosed amount. In September 2021, The Infatuation was acquired by JPMorgan Chase for an undisclosed amount.

== History and rating system ==
The Zagat Survey was established by Tim and Nina Zagat in 1979 as a way to collect and correlate the ratings of restaurants by diners. Their first guide covered New York City dining, and was accomplished on the basis of a survey of their friends. By 2005, the Zagat Survey included 70 cities, with reviews based on the input of 250,000 individuals. The Guides, over the years, have reported on and rated restaurants, hotels, nightlife, shopping, zoos, music, movies, theaters, golf courses, and airlines. Zagat guide ratings are on a five-point scale, 5 being the highest and 1 is the lowest, with component ratings for defined areas, e.g., for restaurants, including food, decor, and service (with cost also being estimated). In addition to numeric scores, the survey also includes a short descriptive paragraph that incorporates selected quotations (typically a few words) from several reviewers' comments about each restaurant or service, as well as the pricing and rating information.

In 1999, Tim and Nina Zagat's son, Ted Zagat, joined Zagat and served as president and COO until 2007.

Zagat's distinctive thirty-point rankings were replaced with a five-point scale for products not at the Zagat website, following acquisition by Google in September 2011. In March 2018, Zagat was sold by Google to The Infatuation, a restaurant rating app.

== Ownership ==
Private equity firm General Atlantic bought one-third of parent company Zagat, LLC, for $31 million in February 2000 and installed non-Zagat family member Amy B. McIntosh as CEO.

In 2008, the company was on the block for $200 million. After there were no takers, the company announced in June that it was no longer for sale and that it would seek an organic growth strategy.

In September 2011, the company was acquired by Google for more than $150 million, the 10th largest acquisition by Google as of that date, at the championing of Marissa Mayer, its Vice President of Local, Maps, and Location Services.

In March 2018, Google sold the company to restaurant discovery platform The Infatuation for an undisclosed amount.

In September 2021, The Infatuation was acquired by JPMorgan Chase & Co. Zagat was made a part of Chase Dining, and the Zagat Survey of New York City restaurants was reintroduced in November 2023.

== Changes under Google ==
=== Initial integration ===
Google is reported to have planned to use the Zagat acquisition to provide more content and reviews for its locally oriented services. In May 2012, Zagat was officially integrated into Google's services, with its reviews now appearing on Google Maps and Google+ Local pages for relevant restaurants. Additionally, the Zagat online service became free to use, and once required a Google+ account to register though that is no longer the case. By July 2013, the Zagat online presence had (alongside its printed Guides, see below) narrowed from thirty cities, to nine – eight in the U.S., as well as London – though earlier content on other cities remains discoverable by outside search. At the same time, Google pushed ahead with plans to "Zagatize the world" through broader simplified business rankings, and by providing broad content unlike the traditional Zagat, both city-specific (e.g., "Great Hot Dog Joints in NYC"), and cross-destination (e.g., "Best Sushi Restaurants in 8 U.S. Cities."), as well as completely location-independent content (e.g., "Rosé for Every Mood: What to Bring to Any Summer Occasion").

=== Expansion under Mayer ===
Initially, however, the eventually proscribed digital and print aims were the subject of an aggressive plan to expand the impact of Zagat through new hard-copy city guides, which required that Google VP Marissa Mayer and a senior product manager Bernardo Hernandez add further editors to the group it acquired with the Zagat acquisition; unfortunately, because of leadership changes above Mayer – earlier in 2011, Google cofounder and first CEO, Larry Page, had replaced Eric Schmidt, returning to the helm to again manage the company – the request to increase the number of "Googlers" (full-time Google employees) was denied, and Google's Zagat editorial division was instead grown via staffing with temporary contractors (January–March 2012). During this period, at least some of the hired contractors were led to believe by Google HR that it was their hope that after the year, contractors would join Googlers as permanent employees, with benefits; moreover, the experience of contractors during this period is reported to have been that of a normal Google employee (invitations to all-hands Google employee meetings and social events, and receipt of at-work benefits).

=== Reorganization, departures, Frommer's acquisition ===
However, as the reorganization by Page continued, and further decisions were made by Google management, the commitment to the Mayer vision for Zagat waned. Page's assignment of Susan Wojcicki to head Google's advertising area led to the move of another Google veteran, Jeff Huber, to lead the very large "Geo and Commerce" area, a new combined group that would eventually include the Zagat team (alongside Google Maps & Earth, Travel, Shopping, Wallet, and other endeavors). This reorganization left Marissa Mayer without a comparable leadership position, instead placing her as a report to her "peer" Huber; Mayer departed Google thereafter, to become the CEO of Yahoo! in July 2012. Other management changes were harbingers of a challenging year for this group (e.g., executive firings and departures, including "the entire team that launched Google Wallet"), and Huber eventually moved from managing Geo and Commerce to join the Google X research team.

Mayer's departure as champion of Zagat's acquisition and expansion, Huber's challenges in leading the large disparate Geo and Commerce group, and Google management's decision on a further acquisition – Frommer's, the venerable travel guide publisher, in August 2012 – appear, in concert, as evidence of changing plans of management for the original Zagat team. After the standard Google all-hands meeting where the Frommer's acquisition was announced and discussed, contractors ceased to be invited to these Google meetings. In this period, Hernandez continued to lead the Zagat group, where it is reported that Google reorientation of Zagat from their original business model to "'Zagatize' the world... [through] 100,000 ratings for small businesses" resulted in missed editorial production goals and Zagat contractor resentment toward the new Frommer's Googlers they perceived as having been given their positions.

=== Dissolution of Zagat team ===
The situation and morale in the Zagat unit is reported to have decayed further when, in December 2012, Google informed the contractors, most former full-time Zagat employees, that their contracts would not be renewed in 2013, only to alter course within days and report renewal of the contracts through the end of June 2013. In this new period, communications between Googlers and Zagat contractors are said to have decayed, with a further end to the social perks they had earlier enjoyed. As well, Bernardo Hernandez departed from his leadership role of the unit.

== Prospects ==
While Google has declined comment, one source reported in June 2013 that "The future of Zagat book production looks extremely bleak... The whole division as currently structured seems to be on death watch. Lots of chatter about outsourcing." Further reporting coincident with the rollout of the new Zagat website in July 2013 indicated both that the Zagat guides are "now smaller than ever," covering the same reduced list of nine cities as the website, and that Zagat had "quietly w[ound] down its licensing business... managing custom print guides for corporations" and third party content licensing.

Regardless, Google's acquisition and integration of Zagat, while leading to the elimination of the Zagat enterprise as it had historically functioned, provided it "a strong brand in local restaurant recommendations... [and] lots of content for location-based searches." Even so, questions are being raised about the apparent change of course, e.g., regarding Google's steering Zagat and its mobile app toward general content, and away from its traditional reviewer stable into an already very competitive, well-populated everyman restaurant review approach and business niche. In commenting on the contraction in number of cities covered and in depth of print coverage, and on Google de-emphasis of the distinctive, traditional 30-point rankings (replacing it with a 5-point scale for products not at the Zagat website), Jason Clampet at Skift writes, "Whether or not Zagat's... brand voice will continue to rise to the top remains to be seen," and while "the Zagat brand may not seem as strong [post-Google]... [the] content's influence on diners and drinkers is arguably stronger than ever, thanks to its deep integration into the world's most popular... mapping service."

== Acquisition by The Infatuation ==
On March 6, 2018, Google transferred ownership of the brand and assets to restaurant review website The Infatuation. They did not disclose the deal amount. The Infatuation CEO and Co-founder Chris Stang released a statement that the company was "thrilled by this opportunity to acquire such a pioneering and trusted restaurant guide as Zagat... it is the perfect complement to what we have been building at The Infatuation." They will reportedly operate as two distinct brands, with The Infatuation retaining its editorial-first focus and Zagat will expand user surveys and develop a new tech-driven platform. In November, 2019 the print version of the guide was relaunched after a three-year hiatus.

== See also ==
- Consumer Reports
- Gault Millau
- Harden's, a similar London and UK guide
- Michelin Guide
- Restaurant rating
- Yelp, Inc.
