= The Infatuation =

Restaurant recommendation website

- Formerly: Immaculate Infatuation
- Type: Subsidiary
- Founded: 2009; 17 years ago
- Founders: Andrew Steinthal; Chris Stang
- Headquarters: New York City, New York
- Areas served: 12 American cities
- Parent: JPMorgan Chase
- Subsidiaries: Zagat
- Website: theinfatuation.com

The Infatuation (formerly known as Immaculate Infatuation) is an American New York–based restaurant recommendation website and messaging service, created by former music industry executives Chris Stang and Andrew Steinthal in 2009. They are most known for publishing restaurant reviews and guides, and as creators of the hashtag #EEEEEATS.

The Infatuation has developed an Android and iPhone app, and operates an SMS-based restaurant recommendation service called Text Rex. In 2017, it launched its food and music festival brand EEEEEATSCON.

On March 6, 2018, The Infatuation acquired the Zagat rating company from Google for an undisclosed amount.

On September 9, 2021, The Infatuation was acquired by financial services company JPMorgan Chase & Co.

== History ==
Immaculate Infatuation was established in 2009 by Stang and Steinthal with the aim of providing honest restaurant reviews without accepting invitations from restaurants or announcing their presence to a wait staff. They later shortened the company name to The Infatuation.

=== Funding ===
On September 27, 2018, The Infatuation raised $30 million from a third round of venture funding from WndrCo, a media holding company co-founded by American film producer and media proprietor Jeffrey Katzenberg.

=== Zagat acquisition ===
On March 5, 2018, The Infatuation acquired rating company Zagat's brand and assets from Google. They did not disclose the amount. They will reportedly operate as two distinct brands, with The Infatuation retaining its editorial-first focus and Zagat expanding user surveys and developing a new tech-driven platform.

== #EEEEEATS ==
In 2012, The Infatuation started to use #EEEEEATS as a way to tag their food photos on Instagram. The 5 Es are explained as a way to make "[what we do] feel fun" and "[to not] take things too seriously." The hashtag was quickly adopted by the food community and has grown to over 10 million tags. The company also operates 22 different Instagram handles, including its main account @infatuation, one for each of its operating cities, and food-specific accounts like @pizza, @avocadotoast, and @burger.

== Underfinger ==
In May 2014, The Infatuation published a satirical review of a faux restaurant by the name of Underfinger, featuring "farm to finger" foods like seahorse sashimi and charcuterie gloves. The fictional restaurant was later brought to life in a pop-up event hosted by Brooklyn restaurant Do or Dine. A short-form documentary was created from the pop-up and later earned the company a James Beard Foundation Journalism Award nomination in the Humor category.

== EEEEEATSCON ==
EEEEEATSCON is The Infatuation's food festival held at the Barker Hangar in Santa Monica, CA, Forest Hills Stadium in Forest Hills, NY, The Salt Shed in Chicago, IL, and Bayfront Park in Miami, FL. The event is described as a "food festival built in the spirit of a music festival" and includes restaurant vendors, speaking engagements, sponsor activations, and live performances.

Festival summary by year
| Edition | Date | Location | Headlining restaurants | Musicians | Speakers |
|---|---|---|---|---|---|
| 1st | May 20, 2017. | Santa Monica, CA | Chi Spacca, Pasquale Jones, Jon & Vinny's | Lizzo, The Knocks | Shep Gordon, Nancy Silverton |
| 2nd | May 19, 2018 | Santa Monica, CA | Night + Market, Russ & Daughters, Cento Pasta Bar | The Spencer Lee Band, Gavin Turek | Missy Robbins |
| 3rd | October 6, 2018 | Forest Hills, NY | Shake Shack x Emily, Jon & Vinny's, Rubirosa | Batalá New York, High & Mighty Brass Band | Adam Rippon, Tim & Nina Zagat |
| 4th | May 18–19, 2019 | Santa Monica, CA | Shake Shack x Petit Trois, Triple Beam Pizza, Mariscos Jalisco | Young & Sick, Hailey Knox, EVAN GIIA | Awkwafina, Dan Levy, Cameron Diaz |
| 5th | October 5–6, 2019 | Forest Hills, NY | Shake Shack x Uncle Boons, Hattie B's Hot Chicken | Lolo Zouaï, Your Smith, Abir | Questlove, Dwyane Wade |
| 6th | May 16–17, 2020 (postponed due to COVID-19) | Santa Monica, CA | N/A | N/A | |
