= Emil Chynn =

American ophthalmologist

Emil W. Chynn
- Born: October 7, 1965; Tenafly, New Jersey, U.S.
- Occupation: Ophthalmologist
- Years active: 1994–
- Known for: Reality television, Advocate of Advanced Surface Ablation (ASA) laser vision correction (LASEK)

Emil William Chynn (born October 7, 1965) is a Chinese–American eye surgeon. He has also appeared in Millionaire Matchmaker.

== Career ==
Chynn was Director of Refractive Surgery at St. Vincent's Hospital in Manhattan, and then Director of Refractive Surgery and an assistant professor of ophthalmology at SUNY Brooklyn/Long Island College Hospital. In the late 1990s he worked as a LASIK surgeon for TLC Manhattan, part of the TLC Laser Eye Centers, which was then the largest laser chain in North America, and listed in NASDAQ. In 2000, he opened his own laser vision correction center, IWANT2020.com, Inc. In 2010, Dr. Chynn successfully performed the highest ASA procedure ever performed in the US, −22.00, on a patient from China.

== Media coverage ==
In 2013, Chynn was featured on CNN and the Howard Stern Show, where he discussed both laser vision correction and his single dating life, and offered his $100,000 Ferrari to any matchmaker, amateur or professional, who introduced him to a "nice girl if she became his wife". In 2015, he reportedly provided medical services to the owner of a modeling agency and then demanded dates with ten models to settle the alleged debt.

Chynn appeared as one of the single millionaires on Bravo TV's Millionaire Matchmaker with Patti Stanger in March 2014. Chynn was the center of a media controversy surrounding several requests he posted to Craigslist, including a receptionist who would walk on his back and find him a wife.

In 2022, Chynn's practice was allegedly victimized by a thief.
