= Menú del día =

Fixed menu in Spanish restaurants

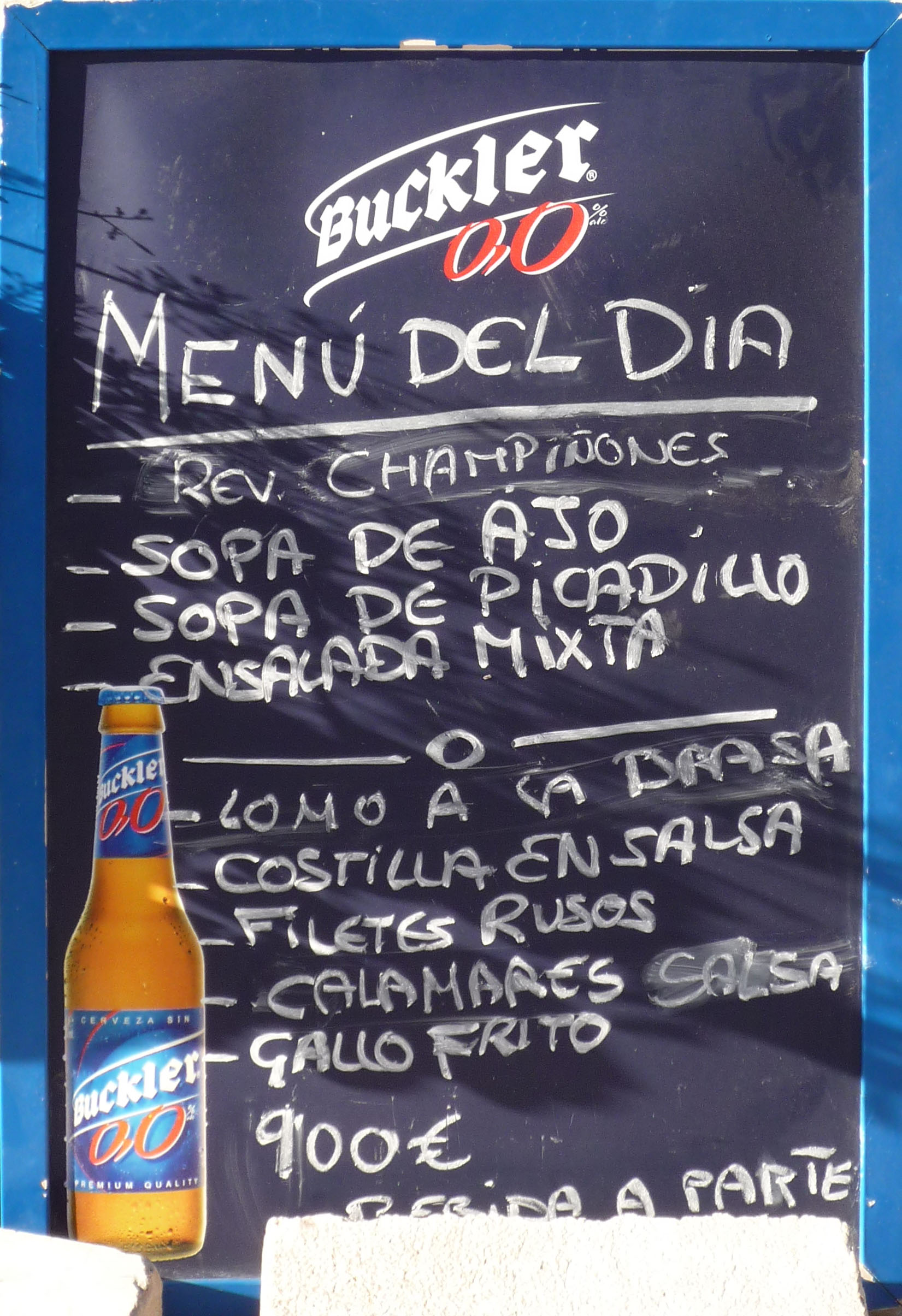
A board advertising two courses for 9 euros (Aranjuez, 2011). Drinks are not included.

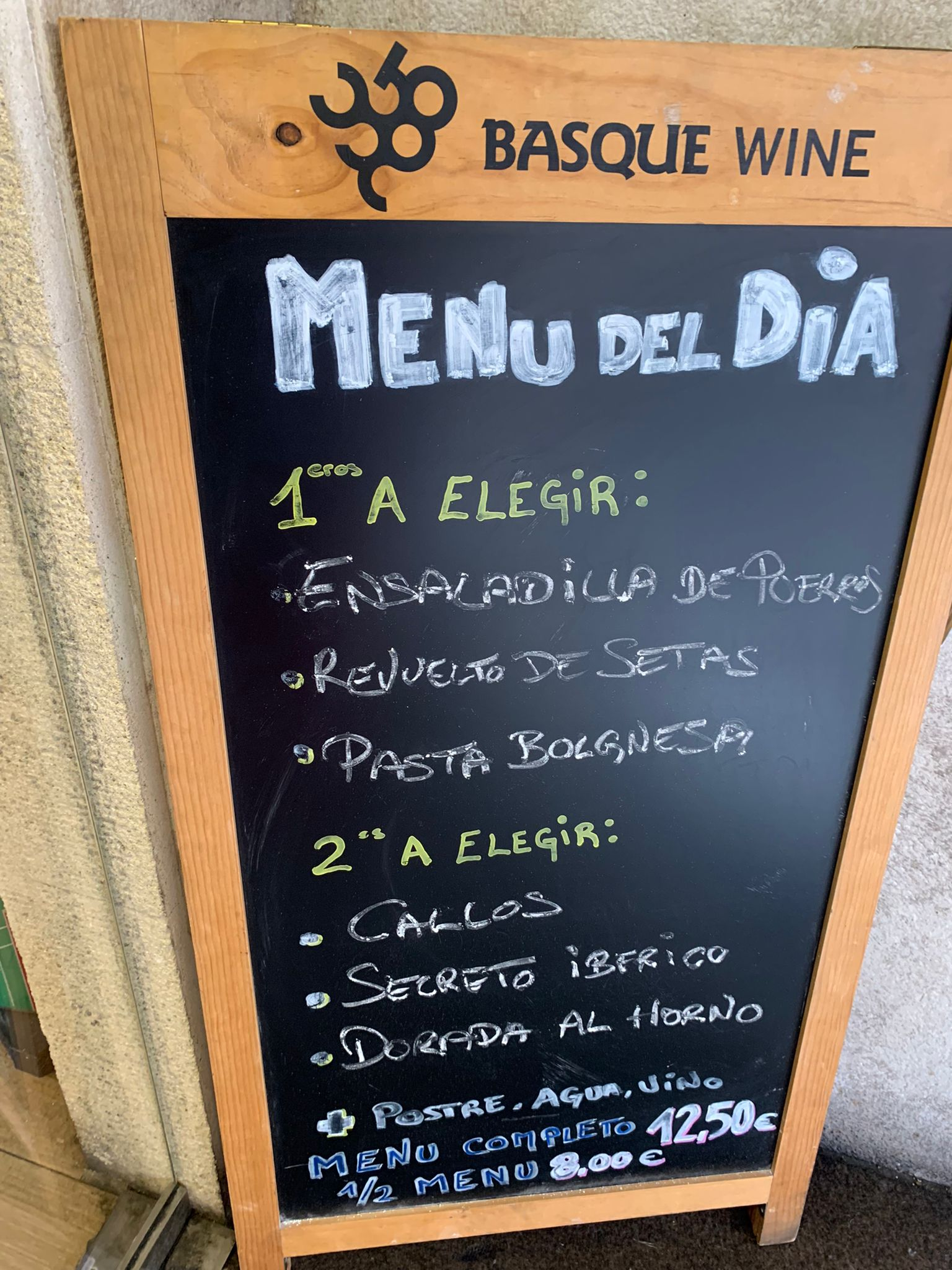
A board advertising two courses, dessert, water, wine for 12,50 euros (Vitoria-Gasteiz, 2022). A half menú (removing one of the courses) costs 8 euros

Menú del día, or "menu of the day", is a set menu or served by Spanish restaurants during weekday lunch, one of the largest meals of the day in Spain. It is known for being economical and large. Spanish people will typically eat five meals a day, the comida midday meal being the largest when the menú del día is served. Spanish restaurants will serve menú del día typically between 1:30 to 4:30 p.m. This is a cheap, economic meal, typically with good food. Besides the menú del día, the restaurant will offer a carta, a full menu with individual courses to pick and mix à la carte. The courses in the menú will be present among those in the carta, but the individual prices add up beyond the menú total price.

Introduced by then-Spanish leader Francisco Franco in the 1960s to ensure workers could have a proper, nourishing, and affordable midday meal or by his minister of tourism Manuel Fraga for tourists (menú turístico, Menú del día is traditionally a three-course meal, starting with a primer plato, or "first course", mostly vegetable-based, followed by the segundo plato, or "second course" (usually meat or fish) and finished with a postre, or dessert.

The menú del día is typically a large meal, with a good price considering the amount of food. The cost ranged from 8 to 14 euros in 2014, reaching 20 euros in 2026 after inflation.

The menú del día is likely to change daily. The type of food served varies with what local produce is available and with the seasons and regions: A menu in Asturias can include an energetic fabada catering for the miners of yesteryear. In Catalonia, the rations are smaller and lighter, according to the milder climate and the lighter jobs. It is usually advertised outside the premises.

Upmarket restaurants may serve a menú ejecutivo ("executive menu") with more luxurious courses and a higher price.

Recently, it is seeing competition from ready to eat meals available from supermarkets and hypermarkets. These may provide areas with tables and microwave ovens so that customers can lunch on the premises. Also, homemade food taken in plastic containers (táper after Tupperware) or food delivery compete against the menú del día

Chef Ferrán Adriá prophesied in 2009 its vanishing due to the low margin it lefts. Mercadona owner Juan Roig asserted that in 2050, nobody will cook.
