= Table d'hôte =

Multi-course restaurant menu at fixed price

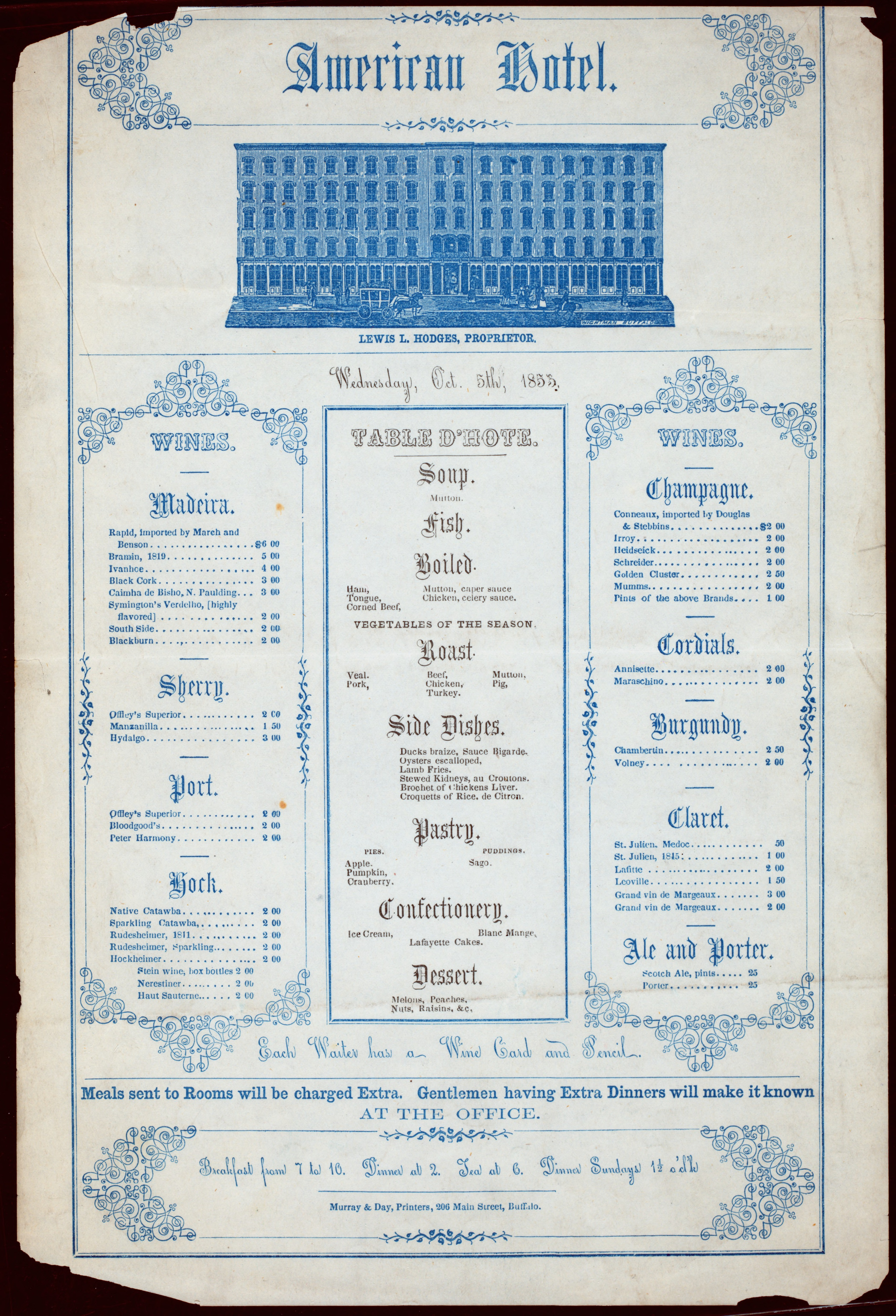
Table d'hôte menu from the American Hotel in Buffalo, New York

In restaurant terminology, a table d'hôte (French: [tablə dot], lit. 'host's table') menu is a menu where multi-course meals with only a few choices are charged at a fixed total price. Such a menu may be called prix fixe ([pʁi fiks], lit. 'fixed price'). The terms set meal and set menu are also used.

Table d'hôte contrasts with à la carte, where customers may order any of the separately priced menu items available.

== Etymology ==
Table d'hôte is a French loan phrase that literally means "the host's table". The term is used to denote a table set aside for residents of a guesthouse (French: chambre d'hôtes), who presumably sit at the same table as their host.

The meaning shifted to include any meal featuring a set menu at a fixed price. The use in English is documented as early as 1617, while the later extended use, now more common, dates from the early nineteenth century.

In France, the term began in inns where guests ate at a common table, called the "host's table" (though the host typically did not sit with the guests). By the end of the seventeenth century, similar meals were being hosted by other eateries (cabarets and traiteurs), and were initially known as "inn's tables" (tables d'auberge). This practice of serving a set meal at a collective table became the most common way of dining in public in Paris until the development of the restaurant. Places which offered tables d'hôte sometimes also allowed à la carte ordering. The term continued to be used with the advent of the restaurant, expanding to include service at individual tables.

== Country-specific practices ==
Many restaurants in the United States convert their menus to prix fixe only for special occasions. Generally, this practice is limited to holidays when entire families dine together, such as Easter and Thanksgiving, or on couple-centric holidays like Valentine's Day.

In France, table d'hôte refers to the shared dining (sometimes breakfast and lunch) offered in a vacation named chambre d'hôte (similar to "bed and breakfast"). Every guest of a chambre d'hôte can join this meal, cooked by the hosting family. It is not a restaurant, there is only one service, the price is fixed and usually included in the vacation. Everyone sits around a large table and makes small-talk about the house, the country, and so on.

What is closer in French to the meaning of table d'hôte in English is a menu ("lunch special" or "fixed menu"). It usually includes several dishes to pick in a fixed list: an entrée (introductory course), a main course (a choice between up to four dishes), a cheese, a dessert, bread, and sometimes beverage (wine) and coffee all for a set price fixed for the year between €15 and €55. The menu du jour, a cheaper version with less choice, an entrée and a main course, the plat du jour ("dish of the day") changed every day, is usually between €9 and €15.

In Belgium, restaurants in the medium to high price range tend to serve menus where the customer can compose a menu from a list of entrees, main courses and desserts. These dishes can be ordered separately and all have a different pricing depending on the ingredients used. However combined in a three-, five-, or seven-course menu, they will be served at a fixed pricing that is usually €10–15 cheaper than when ordered separately. Also in many cases, if a menu is chosen, it will be accompanied by amuses (little side dishes between the courses). Wine and other beverages are almost always excluded.

In Sweden, almost all restaurants—from the simplest diner to the finest luxury restaurant—serve Dagens rätt ("the daily dish") during lunch hours (on weekdays) at a much lower price than the same dish would cost at other times. Most commonly, there is a choice of two or three dishes: a meat/fish/poultry dish, a vegetarian alternative, and a pasta. Salad buffet, bread and butter and beverage are included, and sometimes also a simple starter, like a soup.

In India, the thali (meaning "plate") is very common in restaurants. The main course consisting of rice or roti (flat bread) and assorted side dishes and vegetables is arranged on a large plate. This may be followed by dessert. There may be more than one kind of thali—vegetarian, tandoori, deluxe—the name signifying the prix-fixe items as well as the price.

In Spain, there is the menú or menú del día, which usually includes a starter, a main dish, bread, drink and choice of coffee or dessert. It may range in price from €8 to €30, with €10 being the average price.

In Romania, the most typical fixed-price menu is called daily menu (meniul zilei), taken in the daytime.

In Russia, the most typical fixed-price menu is called business lunch (бизнес-ланч) or fixed lunch (комплексный обед), taken in the daytime.

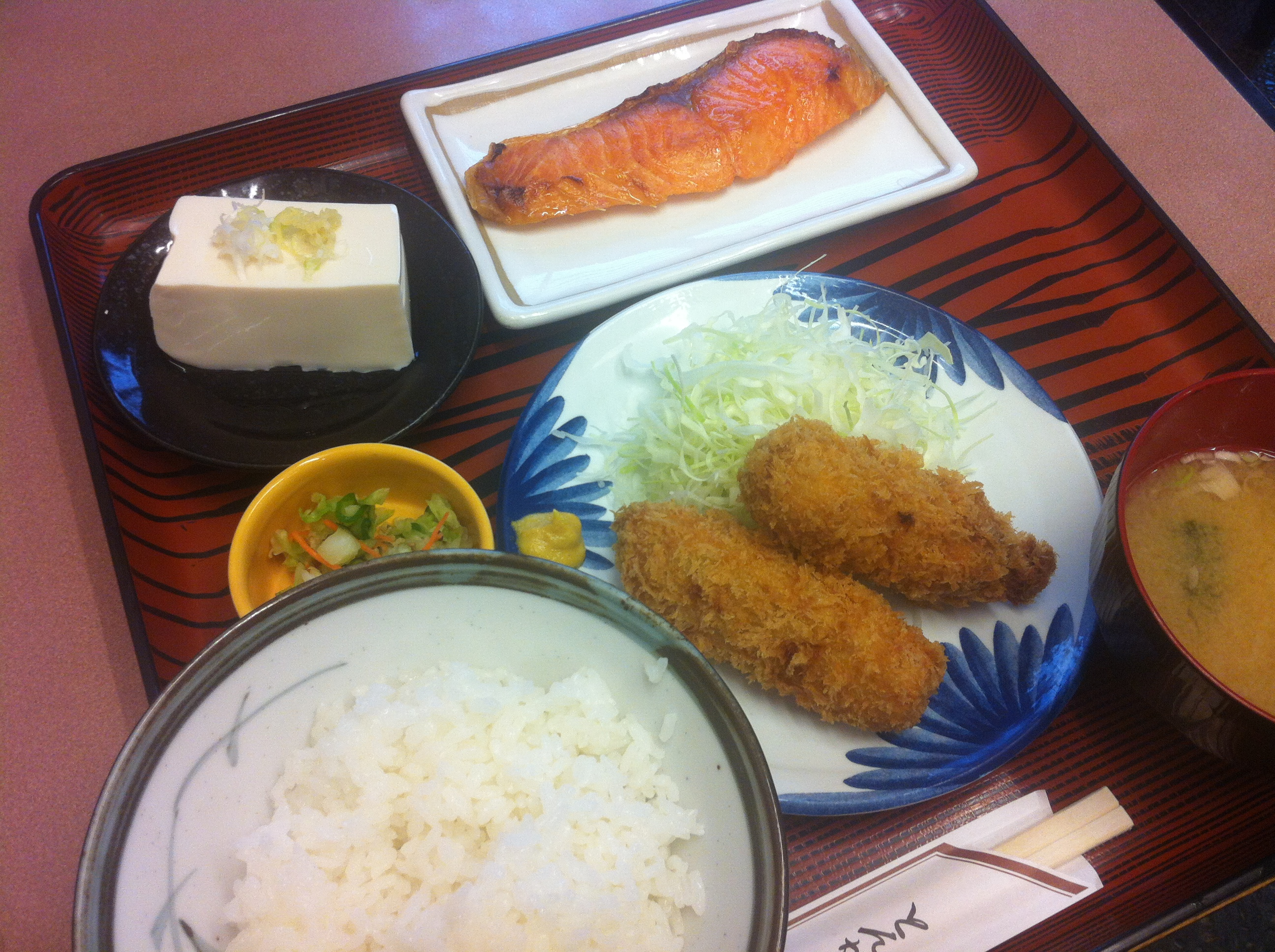
Japanese salt grilled salmon as part of a teishoku (定食)

In Japan, a similar practice is referred to as teishoku (定食). This has a fixed menu and often comes with side dishes such as pickled vegetables and miso soup. Typical prices can range from ¥800 to ¥1,500. The phrase omakase (お任せ), literally 'I leave it up to you', is also similar and means the customer lets the chef select and serve the meal.

In Korea, table d'hôte is also known as han-jeongsik (한정식).

In Italy, many restaurants offer a fixed-price menu (menù a prezzo fisso) at lunch on weekdays.

In the United Kingdom, the format is often seen in casual dining restaurants or pub restaurants alongside an à la carte menu, where it is frequently used as a low-price alternative to entice more customers at quieter times (e.g., weekday lunchtimes). The format is also often found in the use of children's menus or on special occasions, such as a Christmas menu.

== See also ==
- Combination meal
- Full course dinner
- List of French words and phrases used by English speakers
