= Tim and Nina Zagat =

Restaurant surveys publishers

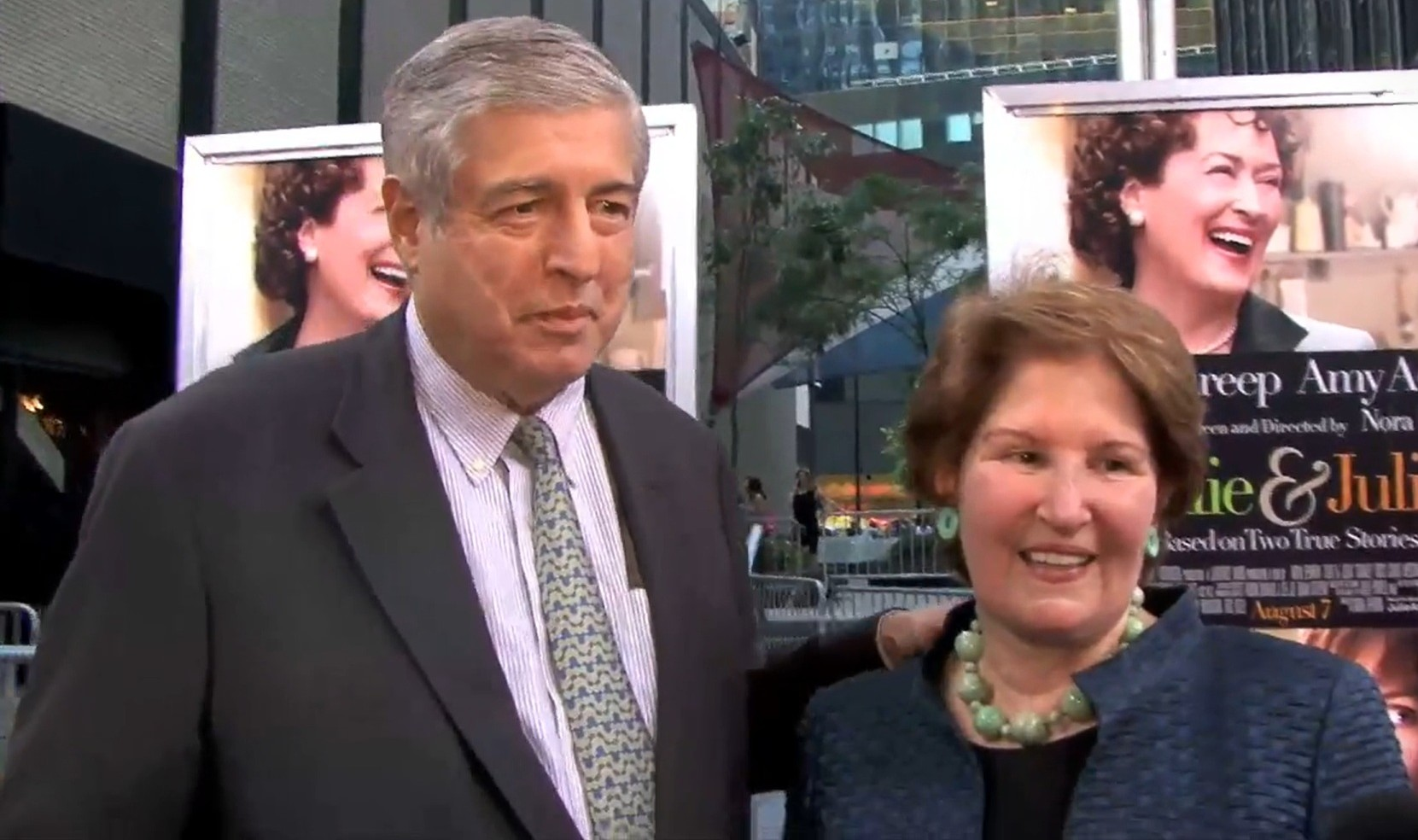
Left to right: Tim and Nina Zagat at the 2009 premiere of Julie & Julia

Nina S. Zagat (née Safronoff) and her husband, Eugene Henry "Tim" Zagat, Jr. (/zəˈɡæt/; born 1940, New York City) are the founders and publishers of Zagat Restaurant Surveys. They met at Yale Law School and were both practicing attorneys when they founded Zagat Surveys.

== Law careers ==
Nina Zagat was an associate with the Wall Street white shoe firm Shearman & Sterling, where she gained notability acting as Seward Johnson's attorney and author and executor of his 1983 will. She represented his widow, Barbara "Basia" Piasecka Johnson, while the will was contested by his children; The Washington Post quotes an affidavit by the children's attorney that described her relationship to her client as "a contemporary, traveling companion and close personal friend whose recompense for loyalty to and support of Basia was the extraordinary compensation." Zagat maintained that "she acted according to Seward's instructions" and the suit was settled out of court.

Both were employed in Paris—he at office of the Hughes Hubbard law firm, and she with Shearman & Sterling. While there, they started compiling their own list of Parisian restaurants, of what they liked and didn't like, and conceived the idea for a new type of restaurant ratings guide.

== Zagat Survey ==
When the Zagats returned to New York, they solicited the opinions of friends about New York restaurants; the resulting compilation eventually became Zagat.

One reviewer described the methodology: "The philosophy behind the Zagat Survey is that instead of one lengthy critical review of a restaurant, the eating public is better served by a rating based on hundreds of responses. By tabulating the responses to detailed surveys, the Zagat Survey rates restaurants on a 30-point scale in the categories of food, décor, service and cost. It also provides price estimates and a pithy, paragraph-sized description."

The company expanded to include other cities and market segments such as hotels, stores and clubs; in early 2008, the couple tried to sell the company for $200 million, but then withdrew the sale when they could not find prospective buyers at that price. The survey was eventually sold to Google, and later to The Infatuation.

== Awards ==
Year	Awarding body	Award	Reference
1994	James Beard Foundation	Who's Who in Food and Beverage	
1995	Nation's Restaurant News	Profile of Power	—N/a
1997	Crain’s Magazine	One of 100 Leaders of NY Economy	
2000	Ernst & Young	Entrepreneurs of the Year	
2000	Harvard Business School	Entrepreneur of the Year	

== Personal life ==
The Jewish-American couple have two sons, Ted and John, and live on the Upper West Side of Manhattan in New York. The pair were acquainted with Jeffrey Epstein and flew on his private plane dubbed the Lolita Express.

=== Stabbing incident ===
On November 15, 1990, Tim Zagat was watching Dances With Wolves at a Loews movie theater in New York City. An "apparently deranged" man, seated in the same row, made loud, obscene comments to others before the movie began. During the film, the man stabbed Zagat until an anonymous moviegoer pulled the attacker off of Zagat.
