= Bernardo Hernández González =

Spanish investor and entrepreneur (born 1970)

- Born: 1970 (age 55–56); Salamanca, Castilla y León, Spain
- Education: Pontifical University of Comillas, Boston College
- Occupations: Entrepreneur and business angel

Bernardo Hernández González (born 1970) is a Spanish technology entrepreneur and business angel. He currently runs his new venture PenseroAI in New York, USA. He was a General Partner with Headline (company) in Berlin. He has been also the head of Flickr at Yahoo until he left in April 2015. He had been Director of Product Management at Google and Managing Director at Zagat. He has started, alone or with other partners, several Internet companies in Spain, such as idealista. He was an early investor in Tuenti, a leading social network in Spain where he served as President of the Board until the sale to Telefonica in the summer of 2010. He was CEO and leading investor at verse app, a digital bank acquired by block in 2020.

He was the founder of StepOne, a company that helps Spanish technology companies in their internationalization. From this company he has started the first computer science talent exchange program between Spain and the Silicon Valley, Jóvenes con Futuro.

In 2009 he was recognized as the Tech Entrepreneur of the Year by the Banesto Foundation. In 2010 he received, together with Nicholas Negroponte, an Honorary Degree in Architecture and Systems by Universidad Camilo José Cela. In 2011 he received the Successful Career Award by the ICADE Asociación. Bernardo Hernández has been included in the list of the 25 most influential Spanish internet people by El Mundo. for 7 consecutive years now. In January 2013 he was named the number 1 most influential person in the American food industry by The Daily Meal.

== Education and career ==
He graduated from ICADE, Pontifical University of Comillas, a prestigious business university in Madrid (Spain) in 1993. He has a Masters in Finance from Boston College and holds the Chartered Financial Analyst (CFA) designation.

At the age of 29, after five years as an analyst and portfolio manager in the asset management industry with companies like Fidelity Investments, BBVA and Putnam Investments, he started his first internet venture idealista.com, now the leading real estate online portal in Spain. Since then he has participated in other online start-ups as a Business Angel, like floresfrescas.com, planetaki.com, 11870.com or the leading social network in Spain, Tuenti. He is a member of the board of bodaclick.com the first Spanish internet company to go public in the secondary market.

Bernardo joined Google in 2005 as Director of Product Management, based in Mountain View, California.

In May 2011, he was appointed jury of the Prince of Asturias Awards of Science and Technology

In 2013, Yahoo hired former Bernardo to lead its Flickr photo-sharing unit.

== Companies ==
Bernardo has participated in several companies, most of them through his own funding company Solón Inversiones:

- idealista.com: he cofounded this company with Jesús Encinar, another Spanish technology entrepreneur. Now is the leading real estate online portal in Spain.
- Tuenti: he was an early investor in this company and served as President of the Board.
- StepOne: President and founder. StepOne helps Spanish companies to get established in the US market.
- Floresfrescas.com: he is founder of this e-commerce start-up.
- Bodaclick: he is a board member of the company since their initial public offering.
- Planetaki.com: shareholder.
- 11870.com: shareholder.
- ermes: founder and executive chairman.
