= The Living Canvas =

Chicago-based performance art series

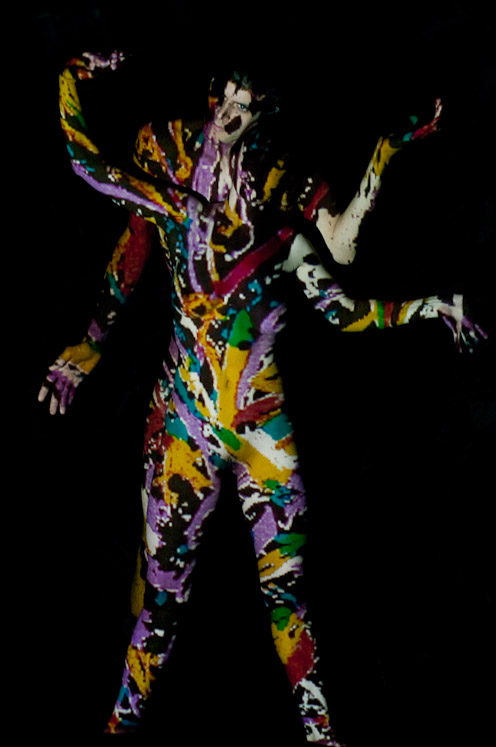

General information
- Name: The Living Canvas
- Year founded: 2001
- Website: thelivingcanvas.com

Other
- Associated schools: Illinois State University

The Living Canvas is an American performance art and photography project that uses lighting, sound, and multimedia imagery, displaying video or photographic projections onto nude performers.

Founded by writer, musician and activist Pete Guither, also the founder/creator of the activist blog DrugWarRant, he's recently endowed the Theatrical Experimentation Fund at Illinois State University where the performance aspect of the project was created.

Performing and touring steadily throughout the 2000s and 2010s, the project most recently acts as a curatorial hub and outreach arm for Guither's photography and directorial collaborations with peer performance companies.

In his autobiography, Guither wrote at length about the concerns raised by conservative critics, relatives of the performers as well as his own mother and father. "My generally conservative parents came out to see the show once. I don't think they loved it, but they seemed to appreciate the artistry, and my dad liked the technical elements (particularly the projectors). And once my mom realized that it was affecting people positively and the shots got good reviews, she finally got excited because it gave her another reason to be proud."

== History ==
After receiving a Pentax K1000 camera as payment for a utility bill, the concept of projecting photography onto human bodies began as a solo experimentation, according to Guither himself. "So how did I start? A dark basement. Myself as the model. Simple equipment including a film camera on a tripod with no timer and only a short shutter release." From there, Guither expanded and developed his concept onto volunteer models, resulting in several award-winning exhibits and print contributions including a United Nations presentation.

The project's evolution from photography to performance art first took place at an ISU experimental open mic. Guither himself explained "That led to a full-length show at Illinois State University. We had about 30 hours to create, rehearse, and tech the show before the first performance of a two-night run. Though exhausted, we were having a blast doing it. The second night, we went to let people in, and there twice as many people in the lobby as would fit in the theatre. The word had spread."

From there, The Living Canvas's first professional production took place in 2001 in partnership with the Strawdog Theatre Company in Chicago with original choreography by writer/producer Mark Hackman who would later go on to found professional street dance performance company Chicago Dance Crash."Canvas" went on to perform at increasingly larger venues including the historic Victory Gardens Theater in 2005, ultimately finding a residency home at National Pastime Theater in Uptown, Chicago.

== Notable Productions ==
- 2001: Living and Breathing Canvas. The Studio Theatre at Illinois State University in Normal, IL
- 2001: The Living Canvas. Strawdog Theatre Company, Chicago
- 2002: The Living Canvas: An Odyssey. Actor’s Studio Theatre, Chicago
- 2004: Ascent of the Living Canvas. Boxer Rebellion Theatre
- 2005: The Living Canvas 2005. Victory Gardens Theater
- 2008: Unsex Me Here – A Living Canvas Production. National Pastime Theater
- 2009: The Living Canvas: Nocturne. National Pastime Theater
- 2010: The Living Canvas: Demons. National Pastime Theater
- 2011: The Living Canvas: Rain. National Pastime Theater
- 2012: The Living Canvas: Eureka. National Pastime Theater, Chicago and Downstairs Cabaret Theatre, Rochester, NY.
- 2013: The Living Canvas: For the People. National Pastime Theater, Chicago.
- 2013 (and other years): Abbie Hoffman Died For Our Skins, Abbie Hoffman Theatre Festival, Chicago
- 2014: The Living Canvas: Rx. The Den Theatre, Chicago
- 2016: Very Much Alive. Center for Visual Arts, Illinois State University, Normal
- 2016: Cathedrals. Stage 773, Chicago
- 2016: [Trans]formation. in collaboration with Nothing Without a Company, The Vault at Collaboraction Studios in the Flat Iron Building (Chicago)
