= Jessica Deahr =

American contemporary dancer and choreographer

Jessica Deahr NeVille
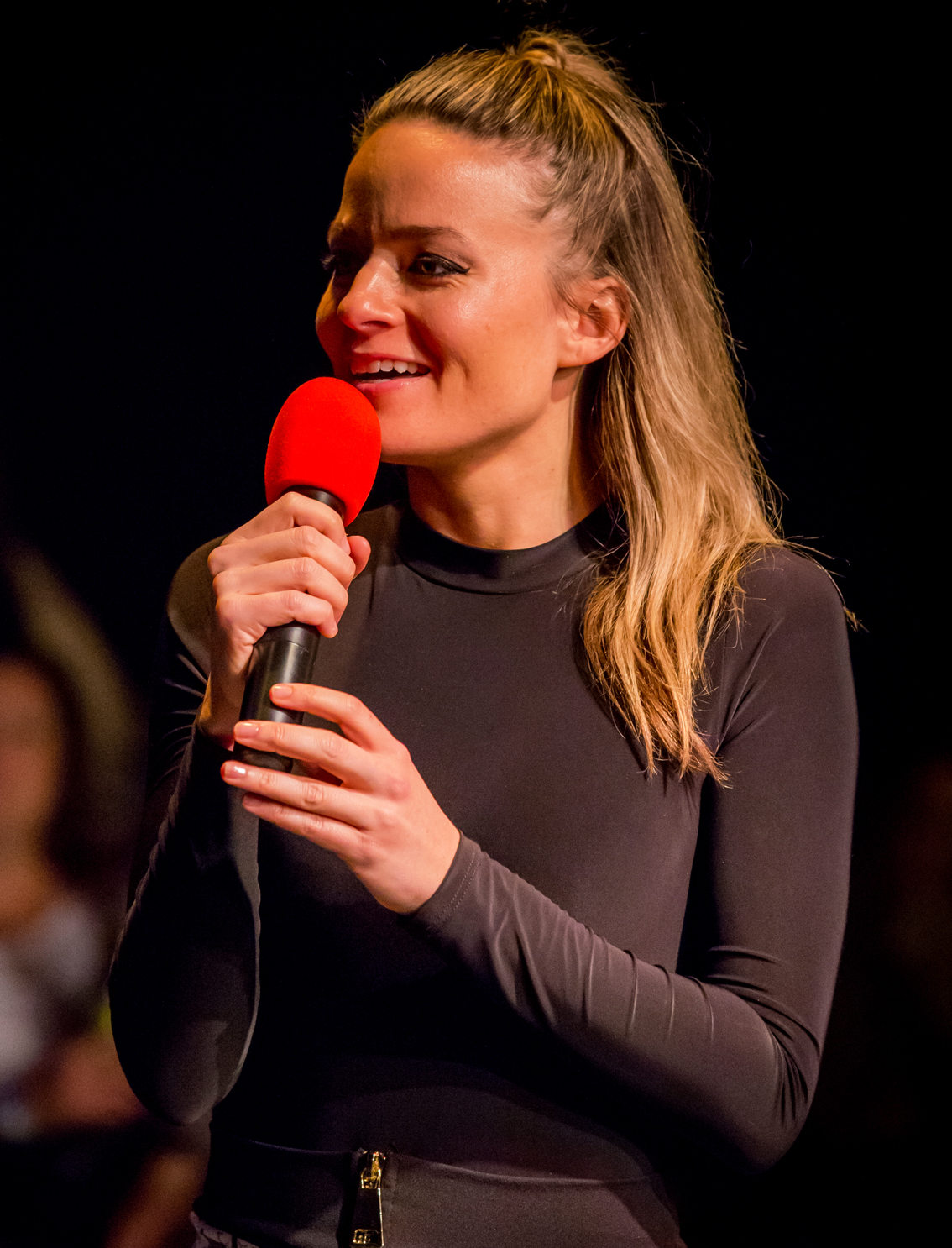
- Born: July 9, 1982 (age 44); Chicago, Illinois, U.S.
- Occupations: Dancer, choreographer
- Years active: 2004–present

Jessica Anne Deahr NeVille (born July 9, 1982 in Chicago) is an American contemporary dancer and choreographer. A dancer and first generation student of James Morrow's "fusion technique" as part of the now defunct contemporary dance company "Instruments of Movement" (est. 2001), she was named Artistic Director of Chicago Dance Crash in November 2012. Throughout her career, Deahr has performed, taught, and choreographed around the world.

== Early life and career ==
Deahr's childhood training began in Arlington Heights, IL training primarily in jazz, ballet and hip hop. Upon earning a Bachelor of Arts degree in sociology with a minor in dance from Illinois Wesleyan University, her early career continued as a trainee scholarship recipient of the Joel Hall Dance Center in Chicago, IL.

In addition to teaching and modeling, as a professional dancer Deahr worked as a company member of James Morrow's "Instruments of Movement" from 2007-2009 while guest performing for Harrison McEldowney and Frank Chaves among others. Combining both her creative range and commercial interests, Deahr performed for artists Nelly, Vanilla Ice, Jump Smokers and DJ Pauly D while contracting with Royal Caribbean International as both a dancer and ariel artist, performing domestically as well as across Europe, Asia and South America.

=== Chicago Dance Crash ===
Deahr's first work with the Chicago-based street dance company, Chicago Dance Crash, was a supporting role in the 2007 production of Tiger Prawn: The Mountain Mover." Quoted as remembering "I had a black sock over my head, was kind of in the background... didn't care. I was just so excited to be part of something that seemed to fit.," she continued guest work with the organization until being promoted to a company position by artistic director Kyle Vincent Terry in 2009.

Having successfully freelanced as a choreographer and upon Terry's retirement, Deahr was named the company's resident choreographer at the end of 2011. As Crash operated without a formal artistic director for its 2012, tenth anniversary season, Deahr directed and choreographed the season's signature production, Gotham City (inspired by the setting of Batman comic lore), which was later recognized by the Chicago Tribune as one of Chicago's 10 best productions performed that year. She was internally acknowledged as the company's artistic director throughout the 2012 season, with her promotion publicly announced to the audience at the company's final performance of the year on November 17.

=== Artistic director ===
Deahr is the first female artistic director in the history of the organization. "Yeah I think it was kind of cool because when a company gets a new artistic director they come from somewhere 'here they are, meet them.' So that was slightly terrifying but also kind of cool because I knew them so well. So was cool to come... with a vengeance."

As artistic director, Deahr most notably expanded Crash's Chicago-based educational outreach arm while taking the organization beyond the state of Illinois both nationally and internationally. Her full-length works including The Cotton Mouth Club, The Bricklayers of Oz (inspired by The Land of Oz books by L. Frank Baum) and Booms Day have received critical acclaim while seeing extended tours. Ms. Deahr appointed KC Bevis as her replacement as artistic director in September of 2023.

== Critical reception and awards ==
Consistently, Deahr's work has been well received by American midwest and national press, starting with her first professional work on Crash earning the "New Voice Award" from the 2011 Dance Chicago Festival as well as being unveiled to the national public as "brash, funky, bright and street friendly in style." by the Chicago Tribune. Taking an interest in Deahr's career, the Huffington Post noted that "Deahr's versatility isn't at all an end in itself; it seems more to be her way of discovering an artistic expression that can go more places, because it's been more places. While many artists see an uncomfortable contradiction between artistic expression and audience approval, Deahr sees both parts of that apparent conflict with more clarity and in a more complete context. One of the secrets of Deahr's vision is that because she can see more of it, she can see right through it." In 2017, Dance Magazine awarded her full-length work The Bricklayers of Oz as "The Most Inventive New Work of 2017" while the Chicago Sun-Times declared "There is something about Jessica Deahr's ingenious new hip-hop dance-theater piece that is so imaginative, so playfully revisionist, and so superbly realized by all the artists involved, that it feels like an instant classic all its own." Additionally, Deahr has been acknowledged as among the "Best in Dance" by the Chicago Tribune, as a "Top Artist" by Dance Magazine, as a featured artist in IWU Magazine and in the New York Times best-selling book "Dancers Among Us."
