= Darren Callahan =

American director, producer, writer, and musician

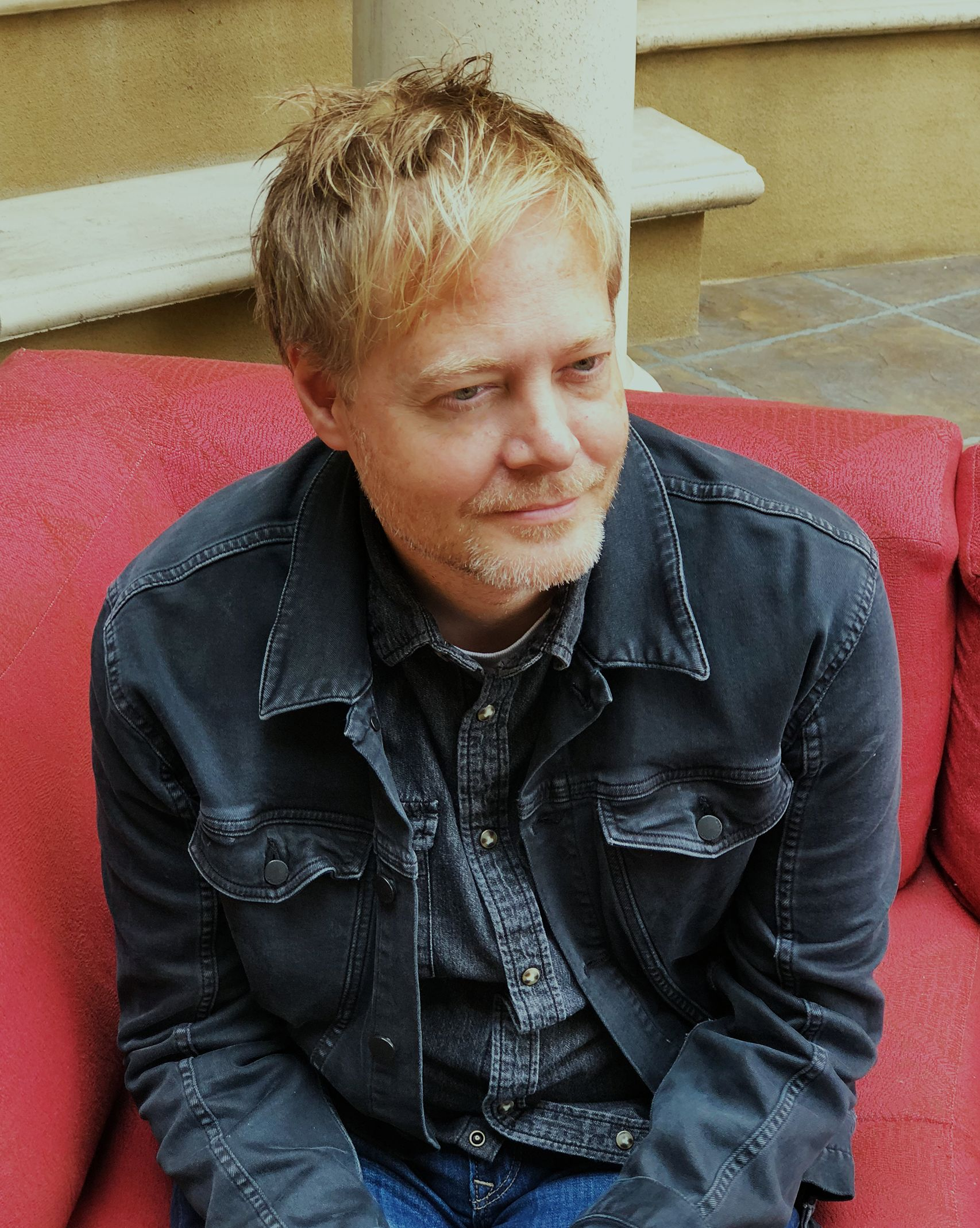
- Darren Callahan (c. 2018)
- Born: c. 1969 (age 56–57)
- Children: 2
- Writing career
- Genres: Science fiction, horror, sexploitation
- Notable work: Desperate Dolls
- Website: www.darrencallahan.com

Darren Callahan is a Los Angeles-based director, producer, playwright, writer, and musician. Stage plays he has written include The White Airplane, Horror Academy, and the three-play cycle Beautiful Women in Terrible Trouble and his novels include the City of Human Remains and The Audrey Green Chronicles trilogy. He has been involved in a number of roles, including director, writer, and composer, in films such as Under the Table, Children of the Invisible Man, and Battle Apocalypse (a.k.a. Chrysalis). His plays have been produced by Chicago's Strawdog Theatre Company, Babes With Blades, Polarity Ensemble Theatre, Chicago Dramatists, Breadline Theatre, Stage 773, Prop Thtr, and City Lit. He has also been a frequent guest on cinema podcasts discussing horror films, including Horror 101 with Dr. A.C., Cinemental, Cinema Apocalypse, Horror Dads, Broads You Should Know, and others.

He has also written for BBC, SyFy, NPR, and Radio Pacifica New York.

== Early life ==
Callahan is from Dayton, Ohio.

== Career ==
=== Film and stage ===
Callahan wrote several radio dramas in the 1990s and early 2000s, including Uncle Ant (1997), The Wave (1998), The Death Guard (2000), The Carnival of Spies (2001), and The Tokyo Tourist Bureau (2005). He was awarded the NPR Best Audio Drama Award. In the 2010s, Callahan wrote, directed, and scored several of Glass City Films' productions, including Under the Table, Children of the Invisible Man, Don't Call Me Loretta, Death & Devils, and the film version of Desperate Dolls. He produced Emily Bennett's Chat Room (2015) and scored for the films Cry It Out, American Barbarian, LVRS, Safe Haven, and All the Flowers That Cut Through the Earth.

Callahan's screenplays are typically within the horror, science fiction, and sexploitation genres. In 2014, Desperate Dolls was put on at Strawdog Theatre. Reviews were mixed, with some praising Callahan's use of suspense and the choreography of the murder scenes, while others criticized it for romanticizing violence against women and for being "more exploitative than an homage to past exploitation films." Among Callahan's many other feature-length screenplays are Kiss Me With Blood, Nerves, Red Park Road, and Summer of Ghosts, all of which have been published by Hooper Cinema Classics. Some of his stage plays include Horror Academy, Mass Grave, Sub-Genre, The Double Negative, and The White Airplane.

In 2019, Hooper Cinema Classics published a two-volume set of his work. The first book, Devil Films, included the screenplays All These Devils, All These Demons, and All These Witches, and the second book, Sex Films, included Sexxina, All a Girl Can Get, and Pleasure Zone IV. In 2020, Battery Filmtext began publishing a 24-volume set of 24 of Callahan's sexploitation screenplays, including Documentia, The Battle For Carlyle, and Salamander Lake. Filmstrips, a selected compilation of his film scores, and two volumes of his mid-2000s stage plays were released in 2020. In 2021, he adapted Brian Pinkerton's Rough Cut into a screenplay entitled Low-Budget Horror. Hooper Cinema Classics also released The Fifth Terror (2021), a collection of five of Callahan's feature-length horror screenplays. Another edition featuring a sixth story was released shortly after.

All These Devils (2017) and Terror/13 (2018) have been a finalist and semi-finalist, respectively, in Shriekfest's script competitions. In ScreenCraft's contests, Terror/13 (2018) was a semifinalist and In Control (2019) and Demon Wasp (2022) were quarterfinalists. In 2019, In Control was a top 10 finalist in the PAGE Awards' science fiction category and All These Devils was a semifinalist in the Austin Film Festival's Drama Feature Screenplay category.

=== Music groups ===
Callahan's first band, The Life and Times, got a recording contract when he was 16. They opened for acts including The Smithereens and 10,000 Maniacs. His pop group, OO OO WA, signed to Limited Potential Records and put out two LPs and two EPs in the mid-1990s. They released a four-disc boxset in commemoration of their first album, Screen Kiss, in 2003 and re-released the album in 2015. They released a new demo and compilation called Lost Valentines in 2020. Travel, a noise rock band featuring poet Matt Hart, released a 100-song boxset with Brazildisc in 2018 and re-released the EP Whiteout!!! Brazildisc also re-released The Globe Hotel by Teenage Blackout. In 2021, he released When a Pill Becomes a Law, a 13-song solo record, and a four-volume singles collection of his songs from the late 1990s. Other musical groups he is or has been part of include DJ Powda, Italian Aviation, Telegraph, The Dictionary, and The Sad Comedies. Callahan is president and founder of Phantom Soundtracks recording company.

He has also executive-produced songs for the late Dayton, Ohio industrial band Dementia Precox, including overseeing a re-release of their 1986 album Huh?.

=== Novels ===
The Audrey Green Chronicles trilogy, City of Human Remains, and The Vanishing of Archie Gray were all published by Brazilbook, then later reissued by Hudson & Hader NYC. Trouble Press published a collection called Twin Cinema, made up of 31 of his fiction and non-fiction pieces. The Vanishing of Archie Gray was named Critics Choice by the Chicago Reader. 6 the Rise (2000) and City of Human Remains (2008) were re-published by Hudson & Hader in 2020 with new art, text, and design. Callahan's early novels include Unsettled and Deep Freeze. Callahan's first book, Hours Until We Sleep, was self-published.

== Personal life ==
Callahan lives with his wife, son, and daughter in Los Angeles. His wife hosts the popular podcast The Things We Know on Apple.
