= Sean Guinan =

American filmmaker and musician

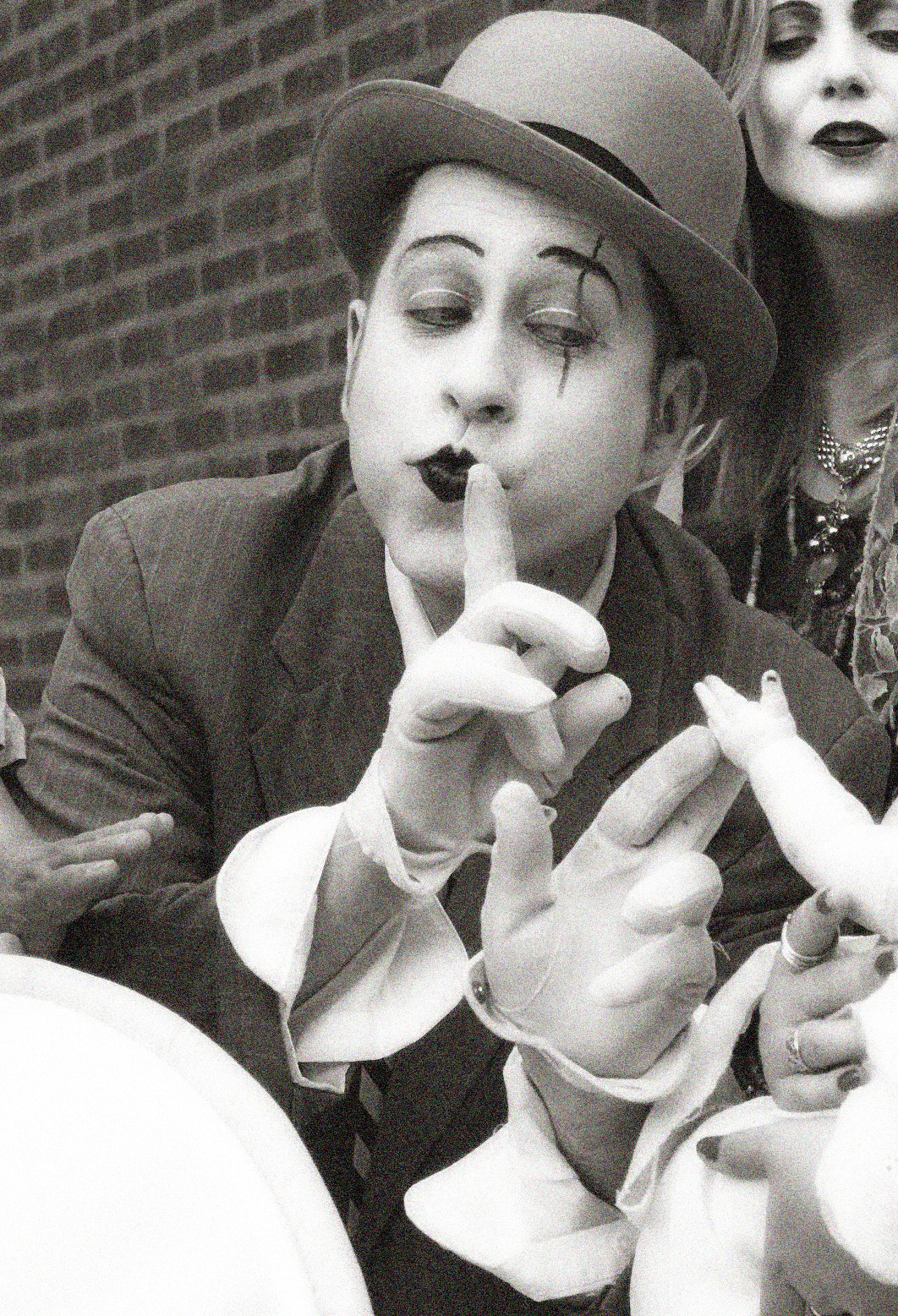
- Sean Guinan as Mr. Dobbs in 2014
- Born: March 27, 1970 (age 54); Chicago, Illinois
- Education: The Chicago Academy for the Arts
- Occupation(s): Filmmaker, musician
- Father: Robert Guinan

Sean Guinan (born 1970) is an American filmmaker and musician. He is the director of the experimental feature Flipping the Whale (2001), and led the Chicago musical group Candy Town during the 2010s.

== Early history ==
Guinan was raised in Chicago, one of three sons born to artist Robert Guinan. He began studying piano privately at the age of eight, and spent his high school years attending the Chicago Academy for the Arts, from which he graduated with the senior award for excellence in theatre. In 1991 he joined the Child’s Play Touring Theatre as an actor, teacher and musical director, working with the company sporadically over the years. During the 1990s he also played piano for The Second City and ImprovOlympic, and acted in various theatre companies and industrial films.

== Chicago Access Network Television ==
In 1992, Guinan became a producer at Chicago Access Network Television. He spent his first year writing, directing and performing in a weekly, half-hour sketch comedy called Possibly Blank, for which he occasionally wrote original music. In 1993 he directed his first short film, Johanna, a thirty-minute, black and white work shot on Super 8.

Discovering he could use editing technology to mimic the visual characteristics of the 1920s and 30s films which had influenced him, he began developing a modern, dreamlike spin on comedia del arte in his work, creating the limited series Faces (1996), the access television movies Candy Town (1995), Alphabet Garden (1997), and various shorts including Accidents of Bread and Cheese (1998) and Missing Children (1998). His fifty-minute work, The Private Pennies of His Merry Dobbs (1998), was the "Innovative" category winner in the Alliance for Community Media's 1999 Hometown Video Festival Awards.

== Chicago Avenue Films ==
In 1999, Guinan and his childhood friend Joshua Eckhardt formed the production company Chicago Avenue Films. Their first venture was the feature film Flipping the Whale (2001), which won Best Picture at the Lake Arrowhead International Film Festival in California, and the audience award at the Critical Mass Film Festival in Clinton, New York. Lennie and Jessie, a short extracted from the film, also showed at various film festivals, and aired on PBS’ program Image Union. Their second feature, Teplitz: The Tyranny of Paradox was completed in 2008.

== Candy Town ==
In 2009, Guinan released Letters from Candy Town, a collection of original recordings of songs used in his prior TV and film work. The following year, he launched Candy Town, a live theatrical band which reflected the retro-influenced visual style of those films, and also featured Guinan's original music. The group was operational until 2016, when Guinan released the second album under the Candy Town name, Lizard in the Wings.

In 2017, he set to work on the script for a Candy Town web series, recording a soundtrack with his Chicago Avenue Films co-producer Joshua Eckhardt and various former members of the live act. When the COVID-19 pandemic hit in 2020, Guinan and Eckhardt were in mid-production for the series and forced temporarily to cease shooting. During this time, they edited two half-hour concert movies of the live band and released them online in 2021 as Candy Town: The 2010-2011 Season, and Candy Town: The 2012-2015 Season.

Guinan and Eckhardt resumed and concluded shooting of the web series in 2021, and plan to release it along with the soundtrack album as Candy Town Follies in 2022. A Candy Town TikTok series is concurrently being produced for release in 2022.
