= Mark Hackman =

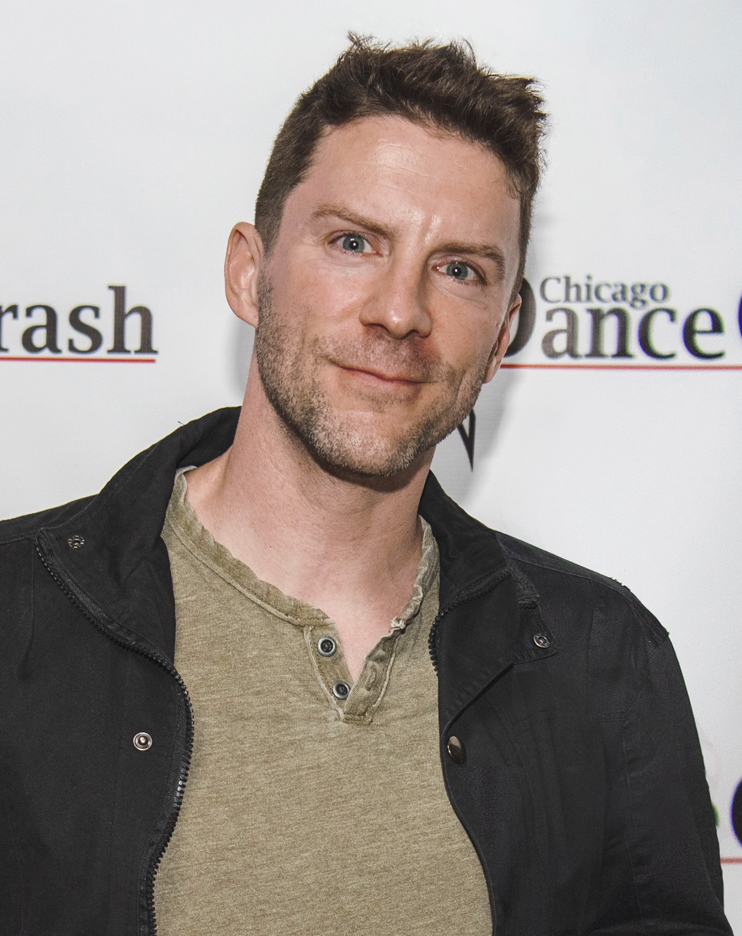
- Born: December 14, 1979 (age 46); Greensboro, North Carolina, U.S.
- Occupations: Writer, stage producer
- Years active: 2002–present

John Mark Hackman is an American choreographer, writer and stage producer. Serving as the executive director of street dance performance company Chicago Dance Crash, Hackman is also the founding choreographer of photography/performance project The Living Canvas under the directorship of Pete Guither as well as the cofounder of The Keeper of The Floor Championship (KTF) alongside dancer/actor Kyle Terry – the production now being recognized as one of the longest-running professional "all styles" dance battles in the United States.

Hackman's writings have been credited for a live production style of storytelling that combines stunt work and dance with recorded narration and dialogue. This concept has been seen in Hackman's writings for nationally-touring productions including Booms Day, Tribulation and the Demolition Squad, Gotham City and The Bricklayers of Oz. among others.

== Hip Hop ==
As a producer and hip-hop culture advocate within the entertainment industry, Hackman has been a presenter, investor or artist for several professional street crews, productions and musicians, being acknowledged among others in a mayoral proclamation by Mayor Lori Lightfoot for his decades of service specifically in Chicago's professional street dance sector. In a Newcity Magazine interview regarding the future of show business after the 2000s, he predicted an industry-wide embrace of hip hop and street styles specifically for commercial performing arts.

== Personal ==
Hackman is a graduate of Illinois State University, and resigned from Chicago Dance Crash as CEO in 2022 to work for the City of Chicago's Film Office and Cultural Department, appointing Jessica Leyva as his successor.
