= Pepper and egg sandwich =

Type of sandwich

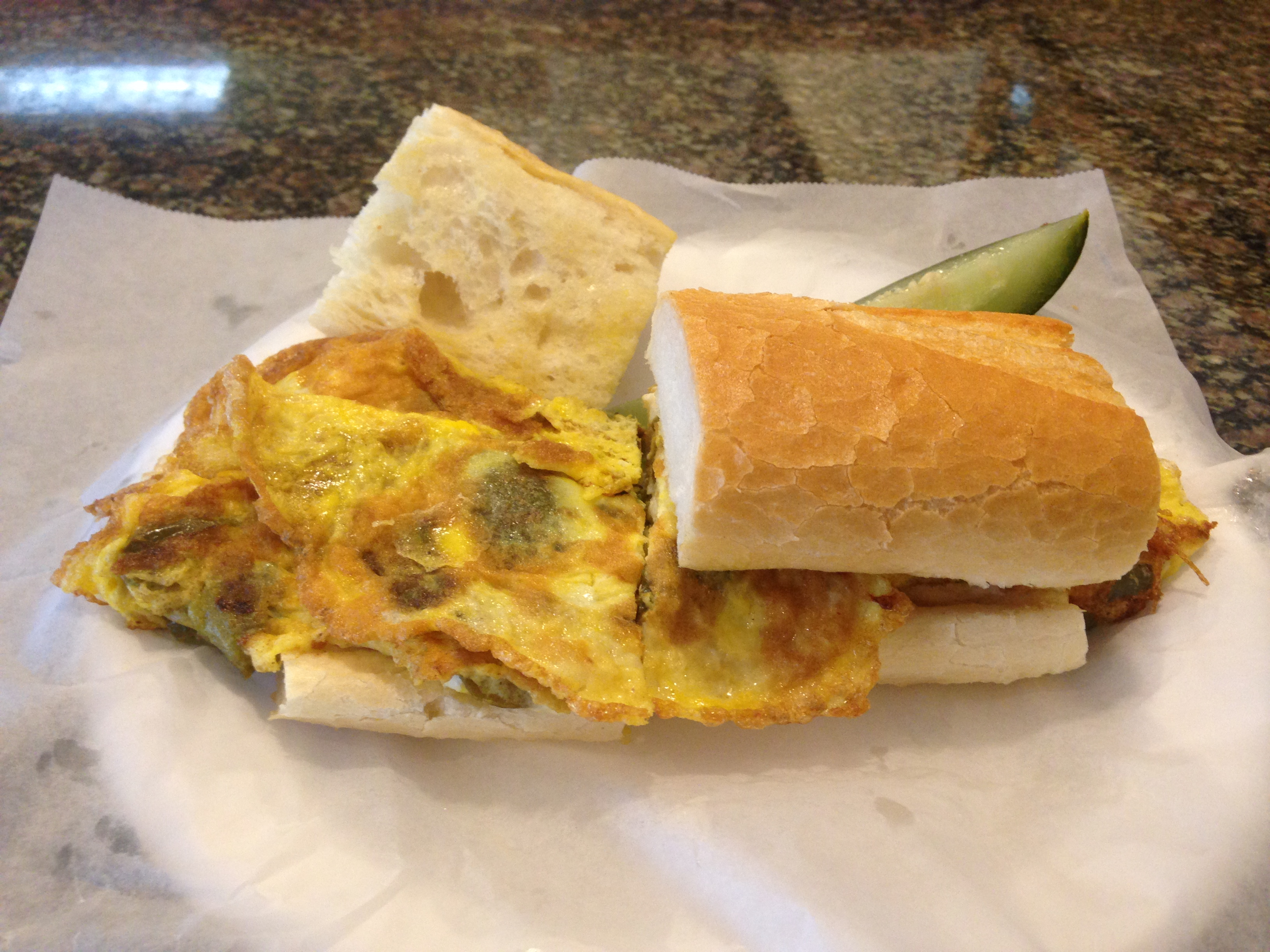
- Course: Main course
- Place of origin: United States
- Region or state: Chicago, Illinois
- Serving temperature: Hot
- Main ingredients: bell pepper, egg

A pepper and egg sandwich is a sandwich made with grilled bell peppers and scrambled eggs, typically served on French bread. It is a popular staple on Fridays during Lent among Catholic Italian-Americans, particularly in Chicago, Illinois. The sandwich is believed to have been originally created by Italian immigrants to Chicago in the late 19th or early 20th century. It is frequently found in establishments that also serve another Chicago staple, the Italian beef sandwich.

== History ==
Prior to the 1966 introduction of revised fasting requirements by Pope Paul VI in Paenitemini, Catholics were not allowed to eat meat on Fridays. After the introduction of the new apostolic constitution, this requirement was relaxed to only cover Fridays during Lent, a 40-day period between Ash Wednesday and the Thursday before Easter Sunday. Chicago's large Catholic population led to the popularization of the sandwich as restaurants wanted to find a way to keep customers coming in on Fridays without needing to serve fish.

== See also ==
- Culture of Chicago
- List of sandwiches
