= Shrimp DeJonghe =

Food dish of Chicago, Illinois, US

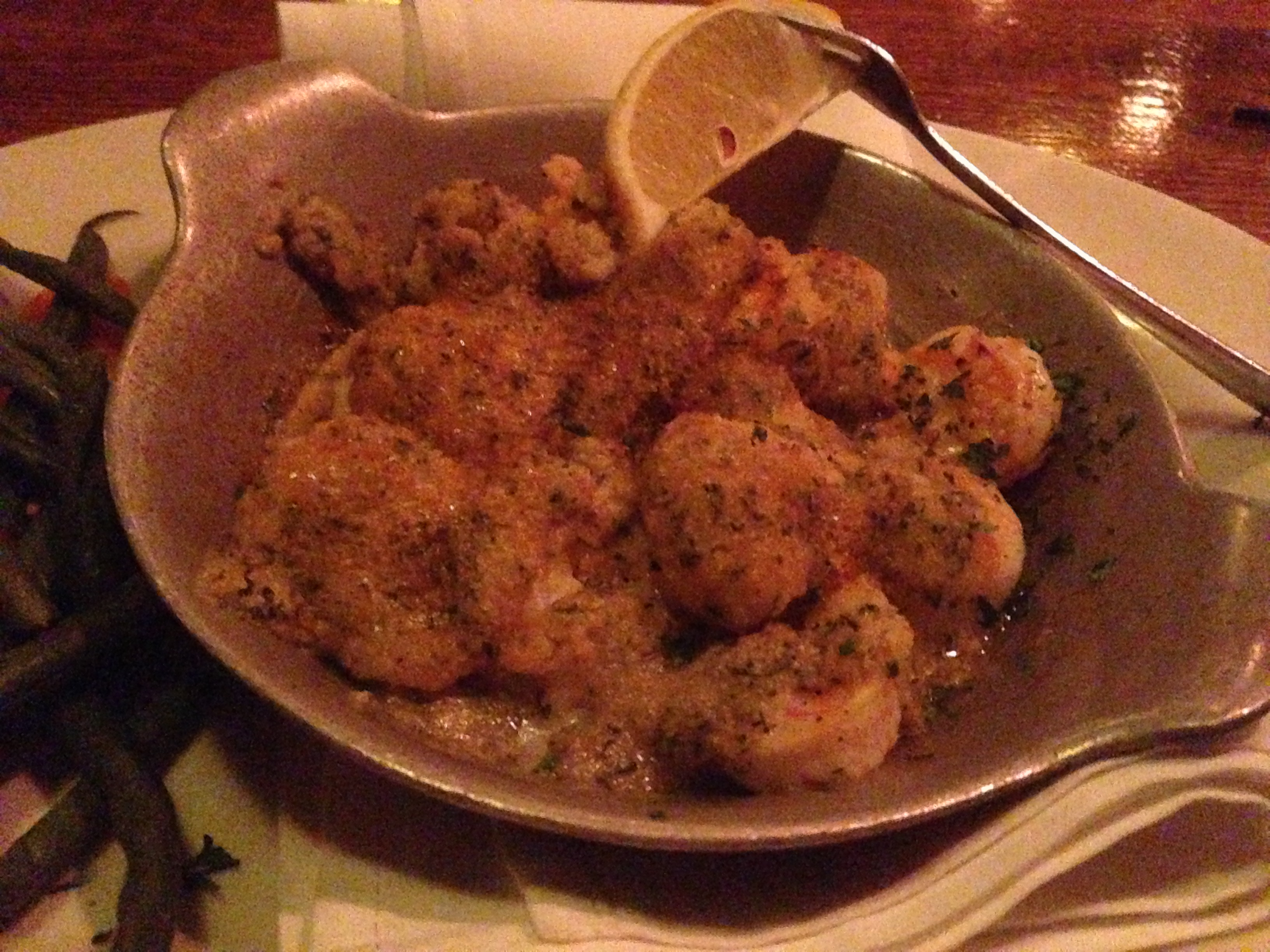
Shrimp DeJonghe

Shrimp DeJonghe, or Shrimp de Jonghe, a specialty of Chicago, is a casserole of whole peeled shrimp blanketed in soft, garlicky, sherry-laced bread crumbs. It can be served as an appetizer or a main course.

It has the oldest pedigree of Chicagoan cuisine, having originated in the late 19th or early 20th century at DeJonghe's Hotel and Restaurant, 12 E. Monroe St. (1899–1923). The recipe has been attributed to the owners, brothers Henri, Pierre and Charles DeJonghe, Belgian immigrants who came to Chicago to run a restaurant at the World's Columbian Exposition, or their chef, Emil Zehr. The dish was the most popular at Fritzel's Restaurant, which was open from 1947 to 1972.

== See also ==
- Culture of Chicago
- List of casserole dishes
