= Frontera Grill =

- Location in River North, Chicago Frontera Grill (Illinois) Frontera Grill (the United States)

Restaurant information
- Established: 1987
- Owner: Rick Bayless
- Head chef: Richard James
- Food type: Mexican cuisine
- Location: 445 N Clark St., Chicago, Illinois, 60654, United States
- Coordinates: 41°53′26″N 87°37′51″W
- Seating capacity: 65
- Other information: Phone: (312) 661-1434
- Website: www.rickbayless.com/restaurants/frontera-grill/

Frontera Grill is a Mexican restaurant in Chicago, Illinois. It is owned by Rick Bayless. It opened on March 21, 1987, at 445 N. Clark Street in Chicago's River North neighborhood and was Bayless' first restaurant. In 2011, the Chicago Sun-Times called it "a study in the art of Mexican cookery".

In 1994, Frontera Grill was ranked the world's third-best casual dining restaurant by the International Herald Tribune. In 2007, Frontera Grill won the James Beard Foundation's "Outstanding Restaurant" award, designating it the best restaurant in the United States.

Although Frontera Grill is not a chain, the restaurant's name brand and logo are used in several of Bayless' other restaurants including Tortas Frontera at Chicago's O'Hare airport, Frontera Fresco (closed January 2020), and Frontera Cocina in Disney Springs, Florida. The brand and logo were also leveraged when Bayless founded his Frontera Foods line of pre-packaged foods in 1996. The packaged food line was sold to Chicago food processing company ConAgra in 2016.

== See also ==
- List of Michelin Bib Gourmand restaurants in the United States
