= Harrison McEldowney =

American choreographer

Harrison McEldowney American choreographer known for his theatrical work, for the 1992 Summer Olympics Closing Ceremonies and for Carnegie Hall's "Give My Regards to Broadway: A Salute to 125 Years of Musical Theater", 17 June 1991.

McEldowney was born and grew up in Texas. He is noted for his comic and witty choreography. He choreographed the 35th Anniversary Tour of American Bandstand and choreographed and directed the Australian Tour of More Dirty Dancing. McEldowney has worked with the Hubbard Street Dance Chicago, River North Chicago Dance Company, the Civic Ballet of Chicago, Ballet Met (Columbus), The Big Muddy Dance Company (St. Louis), Louisville Ballet, Chicago Shakespeare Repertory, Chicago Dance Crash, San Antonio Metropolitan Ballet, Ballet of Texas and the Configurations Dance Company where he is currently (Fall 2006) the Resident Choreographer.

McEldowney contributed choreography to the films Road to Perdition, Children on Their Birthdays (uncredited), and the independent film Vanilla City.

== Awards ==
- After Dark Award from Gay Chicago Magazine for performance and choreography
- 1998 Ruth Page Award for choreography
- 1999 The first Prince Prize (Prince Charitable Trusts, Chicago), commissioning an original work
