= Koval Distillery =

KOVAL, Inc.
- Company type: Private
- Industry: Manufacturing of Distilled Spirits
- Founded: 2008
- Founder: Robert and Sonat Birnecker
- Headquarters: Chicago, Illinois, U.S.
- Products: Distilled spirits
- Owner: Robert and Sonat Birnecker
- Number of employees: >20
- Website: www.koval-distillery.com

Koval Distillery is a craft distillery located in Chicago, Illinois (established in 2008). Koval (Yiddish for blacksmith) was founded by Robert and Sonat Birnecker. It is the first distillery within Chicago's city limits since Prohibition. The Birneckers left academic careers to found the distillery, aiming to bring the distilling traditions and techniques of Robert’s Austrian grandfather to America. Koval creates whiskeys, brandies, and liqueurs in their distillery in the Ravenswood neighborhood on Chicago's North side. The distillery is certified kosher and organic.

== Spirits ==
Koval produces a variety of whiskeys, vodkas, brandies and liqueurs. Of particular note is Koval Bierbrand, a spirit distilled from lager in cooperation originally with Metropolitan Brewing and later with Goose Island Brewery.

== Awards ==
- 2017 Illinois Small Business Persons of the Year
- Illinois Exporter of the Year 2016
