= James Morrow (dancer) =

American hip hop and contemporary dancer and choreographer

- Born: April 2, 1976 (age 49); Chicago, Illinois, U.S.
- Occupation(s): Dancer, choreographer
- Years active: 1995–present

James Morrow (born April 2, 1976 in Chicago) is an American hip hop and contemporary dancer and choreographer. Graduating with a Bachelor of Arts degree from Northeastern Illinois University in 2001, Morrow established the Chicago-based dance company "Instruments of Movement" which operated until 2009. Combining hip hop dance forms with modern dance vocabulary, Morrow's work has been noted as the aesthetic inspiration behind another local professional company, Chicago Dance Crash. Morrow later went on to earn a Master of Fine Arts in dance from Hollins University in 2011 and is currently working as an assistant professor of dance at Old Dominion University.
