= Rick Bayless =

American chef and restaurateur (born 1953)

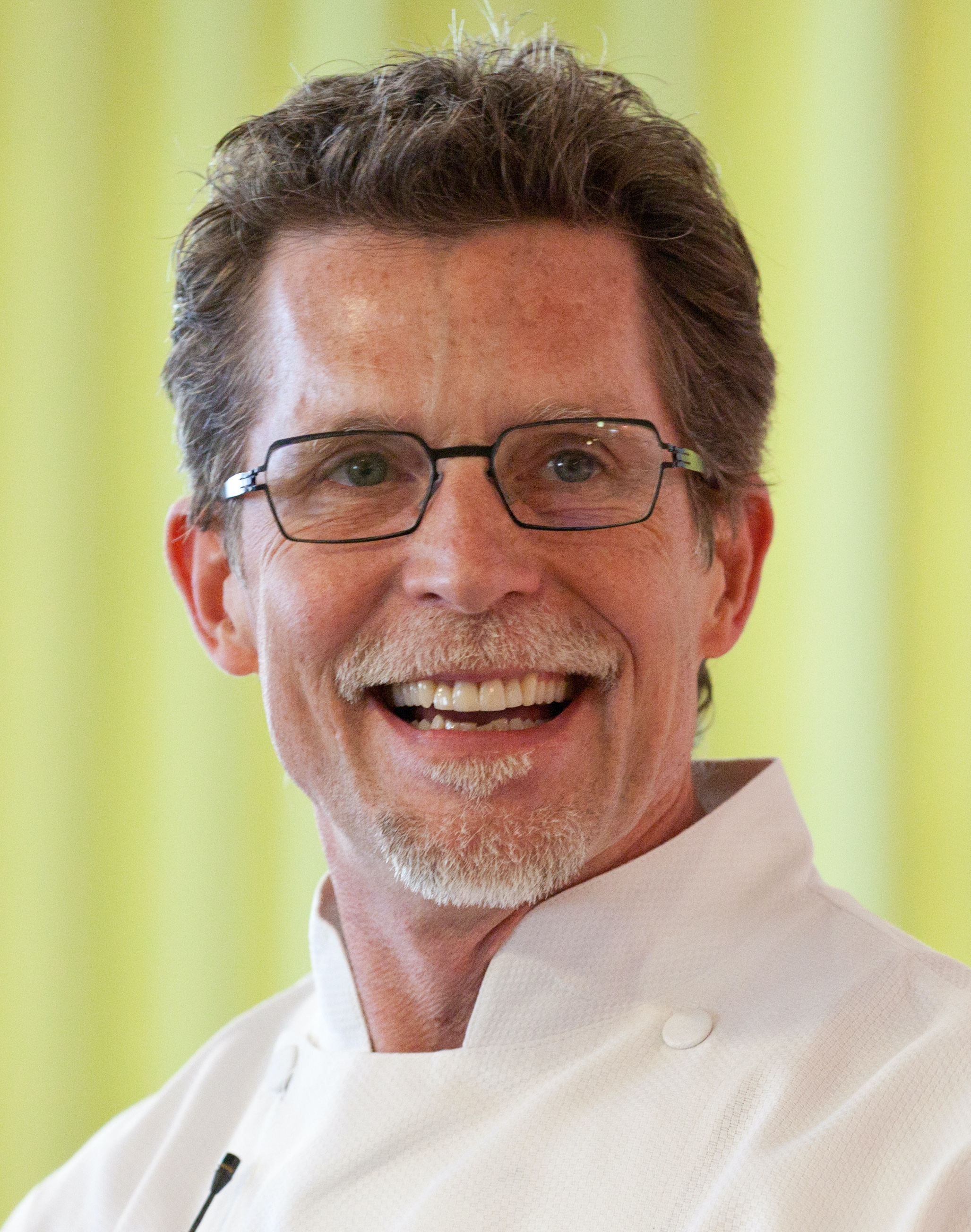
- Bayless in 2010
- Born: November 23, 1953 (age 72); Oklahoma City, Oklahoma, U.S.
- Education: University of Oklahoma (B.A.); University of Michigan (doctoral work, anthropological linguistics)
- Spouse: Deann Bayless
- Children: 1
- Culinary career
- Cooking style: Mexican cuisine
- Current restaurants
- Frontera Grill, Topolobampo, XOCO; Chicago, Illinois, United States; Red O Los Angeles, California, Frontera Cocina Disney Springs, Orlando.
- Television shows
- Mexico: One Plate at a Time; Cooking Mexican (1978-1979)
- Website: rickbayless.com

Rick Bayless (born November 23, 1953) is an American chef and restaurateur who specializes in traditional Mexican cuisine with modern interpretations. He is widely known for his PBS series Mexico: One Plate at a Time. Among his various accolades are a Michelin star, the title of Top Chef Masters, and seven James Beard Awards.

== Early life and education ==
Bayless was born in Oklahoma City, Oklahoma, into a family of restaurateurs and grocers specializing in local barbecue. He is the younger brother of sports journalist and television personality Skip Bayless. Having begun his culinary training as a youth, Bayless broadened his interests to include regional Mexican cooking as an undergraduate student of Spanish and Latin American culture. After finishing his undergraduate education at the University of Oklahoma, he obtained his master's degree in linguistics at the University of Michigan. He nearly completed a PhD in anthropological linguistics at Michigan when he decided to leave his studies to concentrate on his nascent cooking career. While at Michigan, he met his future wife and frequent culinary collaborator, Deann. They married in 1979.

== Professional career ==
=== TV Host and author ===
After hosting the 26-part PBS television series Cooking Mexican in 1978–1979, Bayless dedicated over six years to culinary research in Mexico, culminating in 1987 with the publication of his Authentic Mexican: Regional Cooking from the Heart of Mexico, which Craig Claiborne described as "the greatest contribution to the Mexican table imaginable."

Following Authentic Mexican, Bayless has written a number of highly regarded cookbooks (see §Awards and accolades), often co-authoring with Deann and his daughter, Lanie. Perhaps his best-known cookbook is his 2001 James Beard Foundation award-winning Mexico: One Plate at a Time, a companion to the first season of Bayless' PBS television show of the same name. At least one other of his cookbooks, Mexican Everyday (2005), provides recipes that directly tie into the show.

In 2000, PBS began broadcasting Bayless' television series Mexico: One Plate at a Time. Bayless and the show have been nominated for several Daytime Emmy Awards. Bayless was personally nominated twice for a Daytime Emmy Award for Outstanding Lifestyle/Culinary Host for his work on the show in 2012 and again in 2017. One Plate at a Time's director, Scott Dummler, was nominated for Outstanding Directing in a Lifestyle/Culinary Program in 2012, and the show was nominated overall for Outstanding Culinary Program in 2016.

Seasons of Mexico: One Plate at a Time sometimes focus on the cuisine of a specific region: for example, season 8 was centered around cuisine from Tijuana and the Baja Peninsula, season 9 focused on Oaxaca, and season 11 was produced entirely on the Yucatán Peninsula.

=== Chef and restaurateur ===
Before opening his restaurant, Bayless began his career as a professional chef in 1980 as the executive chef at Lopez y Gonzalez in Cleveland Heights, Ohio. In 1987, Bayless and his wife Deann opened Frontera Grill in Chicago, specializing in contemporary regional Mexican cuisine, with special emphasis on the varied cuisines of the Oaxaca region. In 1989, Rick and Deann opened Topolobampo, one of Chicago's first fine-dining Mexican restaurants. As of 2019, Topolobampo has one Michelin star.

In 1995, Bayless and his partners started the Frontera Foods line of prepared food products. They sold Frontera Foods to ConAgra Foods in 2016. Bayless remains involved as a product-development advisor to the brand. The Frontera restaurants were not included in the deal.

Bayless was one of the founding members of Chefs Collaborative in support of environmentally sound agricultural practices and is active in Share Our Strength, the nation's largest hunger advocacy organization. Often his TV shows emphasize the responsible use of foodstuffs with a focus on sustainable farming and cooking.

Bayless consults for restaurants and teaches authentic Mexican cooking throughout the United States. He is a visiting staff member at the Culinary Institute of America and leads cooking and cultural tours to Mexico. Fluent in Spanish, Bayless favors coastal (seafood) fare and dishes that feature traditional Mexican and pre-Columbian Incan, Mayan, and Aztec ingredients native to Mexico, like chocolate, peppers, and vanilla bean.

Bayless and his staff began the Frontera Farmer Foundation in 2003. This foundation was set up to support Chicago-area local farmers by offering capital improvement grants. As of 2007, more than $400,000 has been given to local family farms.

In December 2007, Bayless opened Frontera Fresco restaurant inside Macy's Union Square store in San Francisco. He later opened Frontera Fresco restaurants inside Macy's State Street store in Chicago, Macy's in nearby Skokie, on the campus of Northwestern University, and in Walt Disney World. The San Francisco location closed in April 2014, while the one at Northwestern closed in June 2018 at the end of the school year.

In 2008, Bayless was widely considered to be a serious contender for the position of White House Executive Chef under the administration of Barack Obama.

In 2010, after spending significant time at local Mexican dining spots, Bayless made his Los Angeles debut running the kitchen at the Red O.

Bayless was guest chef for the May 19, 2010 White House state dinner honoring Mexican President Felipe Calderón and his wife Margarita Zavala.

=== Other media appearances ===
In 2005, Bayless competed on Iron Chef America and lost by one point to Iron Chef Bobby Flay on what was the first broadcast episode of season 1, with American bison meat as the secret ingredient.

Bayless appeared as a guest judge in episode 3 of Season 4's Top Chef, judging both the quickfire and elimination challenges. He later became a contestant in episode 3 of the first season of Top Chef Masters, winning that episode and advancing to the Champion's round. In the championship round, he won the title of Top Chef Master on August 19, 2009.

In 2012, Bayless ventured into the world of theatre, partnering with Lookingglass Theatre Company in Chicago to put on the play Rick Bayless in Cascabel, which Bayless created along with Tony Hernandez and Heidi Stillman. The show opened on March 21, 2012, to favorable reviews and ran through April 29.

== Personal life ==
Bayless practices yoga.

== Current restaurants ==
- Frontera Grill (Chicago)
- Topolobampo (Chicago) – 1 Michelin star as of the 2023 guide
- XOCO (Chicago)
- Tortas Frontera (O'Hare International Airport – Chicago) – co-owned with Jollibee Foods Corporation and other shareholders
- Frontera Cocina (Disney Springs, Lake Buena Vista, Florida)
- Bar Sótano (Chicago)
- Tortazo (Chicago, Chicago area, New York, and the Las Vegas Valley)

== Awards and accolades ==
- Best New Chef of 1988, Food & Wine
- Best American Chef: Midwest 1991, James Beard Foundation
- National Chef of the Year 1995, James Beard Foundation
- Outstanding Chef 1995, James Beard Foundation for Frontera Grill/Topolombampo
- Chef of the Year 1995, International Association of Culinary Professionals (IACP)
- Cookbook of the Year, 1996, IACP, for Rick Bayless's Mexican Kitchen
- Cookbook of the Year, 1996, National Julia Child Cookbook Awards, for Rick Bayless's Mexican Kitchen
- Cookbook of the Year, 1996, Chicago Tribune, for Rick Bayless's Mexican Kitchen
- Humanitarian of the year 1998, James Beard Foundation
- Cookbook of the Year in 2001, James Beard Foundation, for Mexico: One Plate at a Time
- Best Chef Midwest (CHICAGO) of 2002, James Beard Foundation
- Who's Who of American Food and Drink
- Humanitarian of the Year IACP 2007
- Frontera Grill won Outstanding Restaurant from the James Beard Foundation 2007
- Winner, Top Chef Masters Season 1 on Bravo Cable Network, September 2009
- Recipient 2011 Golden Beet Award from The Illinois Stewardship Alliance in the category "Community Food Projects" for his work with the Frontera Farmer Foundation and his support of local and sustainable agriculture.
- Frontera Grill was ranked the third-best casual dining restaurant in the world by the International Herald Tribune
- Insignia of the Order of the Aztec Eagle, 2012
- Julia Child Award from The Julia Child Foundation for Gastronomy and the Culinary Arts, 2016
- Topolobampo won 2017 Outstanding Restaurant from the James Beard Foundation.

== Bibliography ==
- Authentic Mexican: Regional Cooking from the Heart of Mexico (William Morrow Cookbooks, 1987) ISBN 9780061373268
- Rick Bayless's Mexican Kitchen: Capturing the Vibrant Flavors of a World-Class Cuisine (Scribner, 1996) ISBN 9780684800066
- Salsas That Cook: Using Classic Salsas to Enliven Our Favorite Dishes (1998)
- Mexico: One Plate at a Time (Scribner, 2000) ISBN 9780684841861
- Mexico: One Plate at a Time (television series) (2000–2019)
- Rick and Lanie's Excellent Kitchen Adventures (Stewart, Tabori, and Chang, 2004) ISBN 9781584793311
- Mexican Everyday (W. W. Norton, 2005) ISBN 9780393061543
- Fiesta at Rick's: Fabulous Food for Great Times with Friends (W. W. Norton & Company, 2010) ISBN 9780393058994
- Frontera: Margaritas, Guacamoles, and Snacks (W. W. Norton & Company, 2012) ISBN 9780393088922
- More Mexican Everyday (2015) ISBN 9780393081145
