= Mexico: One Plate at a Time =

US television program

- Genre: Cooking show
- Presented by: Rick Bayless
- Country of origin: United States
- Original language: English
- No. of seasons: 12
- No. of episodes: 169

Production
- Production companies: Frontera Media Productions; Means Street; Luminair Media; Mint Media Works

Original release
- Network: Broadcast syndication
- Release: May 20, 2000 – June 22, 2019

Mexico: One Plate at a Time is a television series starring chef Rick Bayless and, on occasional episodes, his daughter Lanie Bayless. The show is distributed to public television stations by WTTW and American Public Television and also airs on PBS's Create channel, with reruns on ABC's Live Well Network digital subchannel. Filming of new shows concluded in September 2018 with the twelfth season.

== Episodes ==
Twelve seasons of Mexico: One Plate at a Time were broadcast:

=== Season one ===
Mexico: One Plate at a Time was Videotaped in Seasons 1-3 Directed by Chris Gyoury

1. The Whole Enchilada
2. Let’s Talk Tacos
3. The Straight Cheese on Quesadillas
4. Sopes and Gorditas: Masa Appeal
5. Tacos from the Ground Up
6. Ceviche in the Limelight
7. Green Sauce and Tomatillos: Mexican Vine Dining
8. A La Mexicana: The Soul of Mexican Cooking
9. Fruit, Aguas, Ices & Paletas: The Ripe Stuff
10. Rice to the Occasion
11. Caldo de Pollo & Tortilla Soup: The Super Bowl
12. Chiles Rellenos and Other Cool Stuff
13. Fish a la Veracruzana: How to Fish for Compliments
14. Carne Asada: The Great Steak Out
15. Adobo: Chiles Cut and Dried
16. Beans Inside and Out
17. Barbacoa and Cochinita Pibil: Down to Earth Cooking
18. Mojo & Escabeche: The Light Fantastic
19. Three Hot Tamales
20. Seafood Stew: The Perfect Warm-Up
21. Beyond Chips & Salsa
22. Holy Mole: Mexico City
23. Chocolate: The Magic Ingredient
24. Green Mole & Pipian: Lessons of the Mayoras
25. Cajeta & Flan: Plaza Sweets
26. Pozole: The Life of the Party

=== Season two ===
Directed by Chris Gyoury, Means Street Productions.

1. Salsa Lessons
2. Pizza of the Three Cultures
3. A Midsummer Night’s Taquisa
4. Open All Night
5. Keeping the Flame
6. Craving Crustaceans
7. Kidding Around
8. Garden Spots
9. Dessert Oasis
10. That’s a Mole! An Elegant Dinner for Eight
11. Timeless Tamales
12. Cocktails at Rick’s Place
13. Torta! Torta! Torta!

=== Season three ===
Directed by Chris Gyoury, Means Street Productions.

1. Chorizo Hunter
2. Color on the Palate
3. A Sterling Birthday
4. Thrills and Chiles
5. Health in the Balance
6. Mexico's Real Independence Day
7. Lend Me Your Ears
8. Antojito Jones
9. Hip 'N Happenin'
10. Tropical Cool
11. The Mysteries of Chili
12. Savoring Sundays
13. Acapulco—Jump Right In

=== Season four ===
Mexico: One Plate at a Time was filmed in Seasons 4-12 Directed by Nancy Bardawil, Luminair Film Productions, Inc.

1. It's a Shore Thing
2. Fusion Revolution
3. Quest for Fire
4. The Capital of Hip
5. Welcome to Tequila
6. Mexico Unplugged
7. Super-Hero Sandwich
8. The Mothers of Invention
9. Go Global. Eat Local.
10. Archaeology for Breakfast
11. Muses for My Menu
12. Tips and Salsa
13. Mariachi Mania

=== Season five ===
Directed by Chris Gyoury, Luminair Film Productions, Inc.

1. Eat, Drink and Be Mérida
2. Fresh Chiles, Hot & Cool
3. Mysteries of the Deep
4. A Pig, a Pit, and a Plan
5. Savoring Citrus
6. Tropical Sweet Tooth
7. Rick & Jacques. Two Chefs at Playa
8. Yesterday, Today & Tamales
9. Yucatan Snack-a-Thon
10. Modern Mayan
11. Paste Sensations
12. Show Me the Honey
13. Hacienda Renaissance

=== Season six ===
Directed by Chris Gyoury, Luminair Film Productions, Inc.

1. Return to Hacienda
2. A Man, A Pan, Paella!
3. Beach Blanket Barbeque
4. Let's Do Brunch
5. Taquisa for Ten
6. Ice Cream Social Skills
7. Seafood Cocktail Party
8. The Whole Tamalada
9. Summer and Smoke
10. Barbacoa Block Party
11. Fiesta in the Fast Lane
12. Tequila Flights and Bites
13. Street Fare Tonight!

=== Season seven ===
Directed by Scott Dummler, Luminair Film Productions, Inc.

1. Tacos on Fire!
2. Chiles Rellenos: The Stuff of Passion
3. Guac on the Wild Side
4. Salsas That Cook
5. Triple Torta-Thon
6. A Ceviche State of Mind
7. The Soul of Mole
8. The Case for Quesadillas
9. Confessions of a Carnita-vore
10. Tacos Hola!
11. A Whole New Enchilada
12. Chorizo Made Easy
13. Liquid Gold

=== Season eight ===
Directed by Scott Dummler, Luminair Film Productions, Inc.

1. Mediterranean Baja
2. Tijuana Taco Crawl
3. Cooking on the Sea of Cortez
4. Presenting World-Class Wines of Baja
5. Eat Like a Local in Los Cabos
6. From Lobster to Chocolate Clams: A Delicious Feast in Magdalena Bay
7. Cooking in Wine Country
8. Tijuana Round Table
9. Extraordinarily Delicious Ensenada
10. Mexican Microbrews and Pub Fare
11. Sustainable Aquaculture in the Rich Waters of Ensenada
12. Todos Santos Magic
13. Baja Beach House Cooking

=== Season nine ===
Directed By Scott Dummler, Luminair Film Productions, Inc

1. Oaxaca's Most Magical Holiday
2. Oaxaca’s Live-Fire Cooking
3. Off the Beaten Path in Huatulco
4. Artisan Mescal
5. Oaxaca, The Land of Seven Moles
6. Delicious Eco-Tourism
7. The Kernel of Deliciousness
8. Mercado Madness
9. Oaxacan Cheese Primer
10. Puerto Escondido: Living the Dream
11. Chocolate & Coffee From Bean to Cup
12. Bringing Oaxaca Home
13. Oaxaca’s Top Chefs

=== Season ten ===
Directed By Scott Dummler, Mint Media Works Productions, Inc

1. A Seafood Dream
2. A Chef’s Path
3. Island Time
4. Under The Influence (of tacos)
5. Mexico: It’s (a) Wine Country
6. Artisanal Bread in Tortilla Land
7. Shaking up the Margarita
8. How to Feed A City
9. A Passion for Cheese
10. Market Inspirations, Local Genius
11. Mexican Chocolate: The Next Chapter
12. Building a World-Class Cuisine Starts with a Sound Foundation
13. It All Begins with Beans

=== Season eleven ===
Directed By Scott Dummler, Mint Media Works Productions, Inc.

1. The Hunt for Caribbean lobster
2. A Tour of Traditions
3. Off the Beaten Path in Playa del Carmen
4. Ceviches Gone Wild
5. Cooking Like a Local
6. Love of Live Fire Cooking
7. Baking Up Comfort
8. The Splendor of Yucatán’s Enchanting Markets
9. A Place of Deeply Rooted Innovation
10. Chocolate Dreams, Cacao Fantasies
11. Dreaming of Sustainable Agriculture
12. Pit Cooking, Sacred and Smoking
13. Examining the Yucatán’s Abundant Natural Resources

=== Season twelve ===
Directed By Scott Dummler, Mint Media Works Productions, Inc.

1. A Tour of Tacos al Pastor
2. Chilaquiles, Comforting and Classic
3. Chocolate and Churros, Breakfast of Champions
4. Teaching Tortilla Soup
5. Picture-Perfect Pozole Party
6. Beautifully Balanced Ceviche
7. Tried & True Tamales
8. Choosing Chilles Rellenos
9. You Don't Know the Whole Enchilada
10. Crispy Carnitas
11. Always Time for Tacos
12. All in for Albondigas
13. Mole is Mexico's Mother Sauce
