= Robert Guinan =

American painter (1934–2016)

Robert Guinan (March 14, 1934 – April 3, 2016) was an American painter based in Chicago. The subject matter of his work includes but has not been limited to street performers, musicians, barflies, historical scenes, landscapes and building structures. Lauded in Europe but widely unknown in his native Chicago, Guinan's work reflects a documentary quality that has been compared to "that of the Parisian demi-mondes as chronicled and interpreted by Toulouse-Lautrec."

== Collections ==
Public collections include Fonds National d’Art Contemporain, Paris; Musée des Beaux-Arts, Lyon; Musée de Grenoble; Musée du dessin et de l’estampe originale, Gravelines; Metropolitan Museum of Art, New York; Sintra Museu de Arte Moderna, Collection Berardo, Sintra, Portugal.

== Exhibitions ==
Guinan's work has been featured in exhibitions as follows:

Year	Exhibition
1950	Roswell P. Flower Memorial Library, Watertown, New York.
1961	"The Little Chapel around the Corner”, Chicago; “Robert Guinan: paintings, drawings, lithographs”, Contemporary Art Workshop, Chicago.
1969	Evanston Art Center, Evanston, IL.
1972	Galerie Ariadne, Vienna.
1973	Galerie Albert Loeb, Paris.
1974	Galerie Albert Loeb, Paris.
1976	Atelier-Galerie Le Lutrin, Lyon. “Dessins”, Galerie Albert Loeb, Paris.
1977	“Peintures”, F.I.A.C., Paris, Galerie Albert Loeb. “Peintures”, Galerie Albert Loeb, Paris.
1978	Galerie Albert Loeb, Paris.
1979	Galleria Documenta, Turin. “Peintures”, Galerie Albert Loeb, Paris.
1981	F.I.A.C., Paris, Galerie Albert Loeb. Musée de Grenoble.
1982	Musée d'Ixelles, Bruxelles. Lens Fine Art, Anvers.
1985	Galerie Albert Loeb, Paris.
1986	“Dessins”, F.I.A.C., Paris, Galerie Albert Loeb.
1988	“Dessins de 1972 à 1987”, Galerie Albert Loeb, Paris.
1989	Chicago International Art Exposition, Galerie Albert Loeb. “Peintures et études”, Galerie Albert Loeb, Paris.
1990	F.I.A.C., Paris, Galerie Albert Loeb. Galerie Albert Loeb, Paris.
1991	F.I.A.C., Paris, Galerie Albert Loeb.
1997	“Les portraits de Loretta”, peintures et dessins, F.I.A.C., Paris, Galerie Albert Loeb.
1998	“Dessins 1988-1998, oeuvre gravé et lithographié 1961-1998”, Association Malbodium Museum, Centre Culturel de l’Arsenal, Maubeuge; "Oeuvres des années soixante", Galerie Albert Loeb, Paris; "Peintures et dessins", LARC, scène Nationale, Le Creusot.
2001	Galerie Albert Loeb, Paris.
2005	Académie de France à Rome, Villa Medici, Rome
2006	Galerie Albert Loeb, Paris.

Group Exhibitions

Year	Exhibition
1957	“Seventh Regional Art Exhibition”, Syracuse Museum of Fine Arts, Etat de New-York.
1968	“Nonplussed Some”, Hyde Park Art Center, Chicago, with Ed Paschke, Edward C. Flood, Sarah A. Canright, Richard D. Wetzel.
1972	Foire de Bâle, “Art 72”, Galerie Ariadne, Vienna.
1976	"Chemins de la Création", Château d'Ancy-le-Franc, France. “Nouvelle Subjectivité”, Festival d'Automne, Paris.
1977	“Nouvelle Subjectivité”, Palais des Beaux-Arts, Bruxelles. “Nouvelle Subjectivité”, Espace Lyonnais d’Art Contemporain, Lyon. "Réalisme, réel, réalité, Abbaye de Beaulieu en Rouergue
1978 - 1979	Ateliers d'Aujourd'hui : Oeuvres contemporaines des collections nationales, Musée National d'Art Moderne, Centre Georges Pompidou, Paris.
1982	Biennale de Venise, Pavillon International.
1984	"L'Imagine e il suo doppio", Italie (exposition itinérante). “Souvenirs d'un musée à la campagne”, Château de Tanlay, France.
1985	“Neuf artistes de la Galerie Albert Loeb”, Galleria Forni, Bologne.
1987	Foire de Bâle, “Art’ 87", Galerie Albert Loeb.
1990, 1991	Salon de Mars, Paris, Galerie Albert Loeb.
1991, 1996	F.I.A.C., Paris, Galerie Albert Loeb.
1997	“La Pelle Nera”, Galleria Marieschi, Monza, Italy.
1999–2000	“Exterior Spaces, Interior Spaces”, Musée de Villach, Austria.
2000, 2003	Pavillon des Antiquaires et des Beaux-Arts, Paris, Galerie Albert Loeb, Paris.

== Films ==
Robert Guinan's life and work has been the subject of two films, including the 1995 documentary Division Street U.S.A.: Following Robert Guinan (Frédéric Compain, 52 min, Coproduction Dune, Leapfrog Production, Arte - G.E.I.E.) and the 2006 documentary Robert Guinan, un peintre en marge du rêve américain (Albert Loeb and Nicole Sérès, 48 min, Les Films Lazare)

== Life and career ==
Guinan was born in 1934 in Watertown, New York. Boyhood fascination with the work of magazine illustrator Herbert Morton Stoops led to an interest in drawing and painting. Because formal art instruction was not offered at Immaculate Heart Academy (IHA), Guinan's mother Dorothy arranged night classes for her son with Mary Morley, an art teacher at Watertown High School.

Guinan's first exhibition occurred when he was just 15 at the Watertown library. A critic in the Watertown Daily Times called the show "a most creditable exhibit for an artist of his age and training". It led to annual exhibits of his works through his high school years. Times writer David F. Lane wrote in 1950 that his paintings were "of such character in composition, coloration and brush technique as to definitely forecast a promising future for him in the field of art." He praised the 16-year-old artist's "rare genius for capturing action in tense moments, and in rendering facial expressions which accurately represent the mood and thought of the character."

Guinan graduated from IHA in 1951. Living in a YMCA hotel, his first job was as an assistant in a dental lab, constructing false teeth. He enlisted in the Air Force in 1953, after considering a potential Army draft during the Korean War. He served as a radio operator in North Africa and Turkey while continuing to practice drawing and painting. Emulating the post-impressionists who were his heroes, he took an interest in the peasant life and brothels he encountered in Ankara, embarking upon a life's work of portraying the disenfranchised in his paintings and drawings. It was also during his time in the Air Force that Guinan developed an interest in African-American Blues and Jazz.

In 1959, Guinan moved to Chicago, Illinois, enrolling in the School of the Art Institute. He was immediately enthralled by the nightclub culture of the city, discovering that many of the Black recording artists he loved were living and performing in local nightclubs such as the King's Palace and the Queen's Paradise. He also discovered Maxwell Street, an open-air market which had been a Chicago tradition since the beginning of the century; once dominated by Jewish merchants, it was now popular with African American peddlers and Blues musicians.

In 1972, Robert Guinan was introduced to Parisian art dealer Albert Loeb. Beginning in 1973, Guinan worked regularly with the Albert Loeb Gallery. As of 2010 he is represented locally in Chicago.

Guinan died in Evanston in 2016. One son, Paul, is a comic-book artist and creator of the fictional character Boilerplate. Another son, Sean Guinan (b. 1970), is a film maker and musician known for prize-winning films including "Teplitz; the Tyranny of Paradox" and "Flipping the Whale", and his cabaret-style band, Candy Town.
