= Chicago Dance Crash =

US physical theater and street dance company

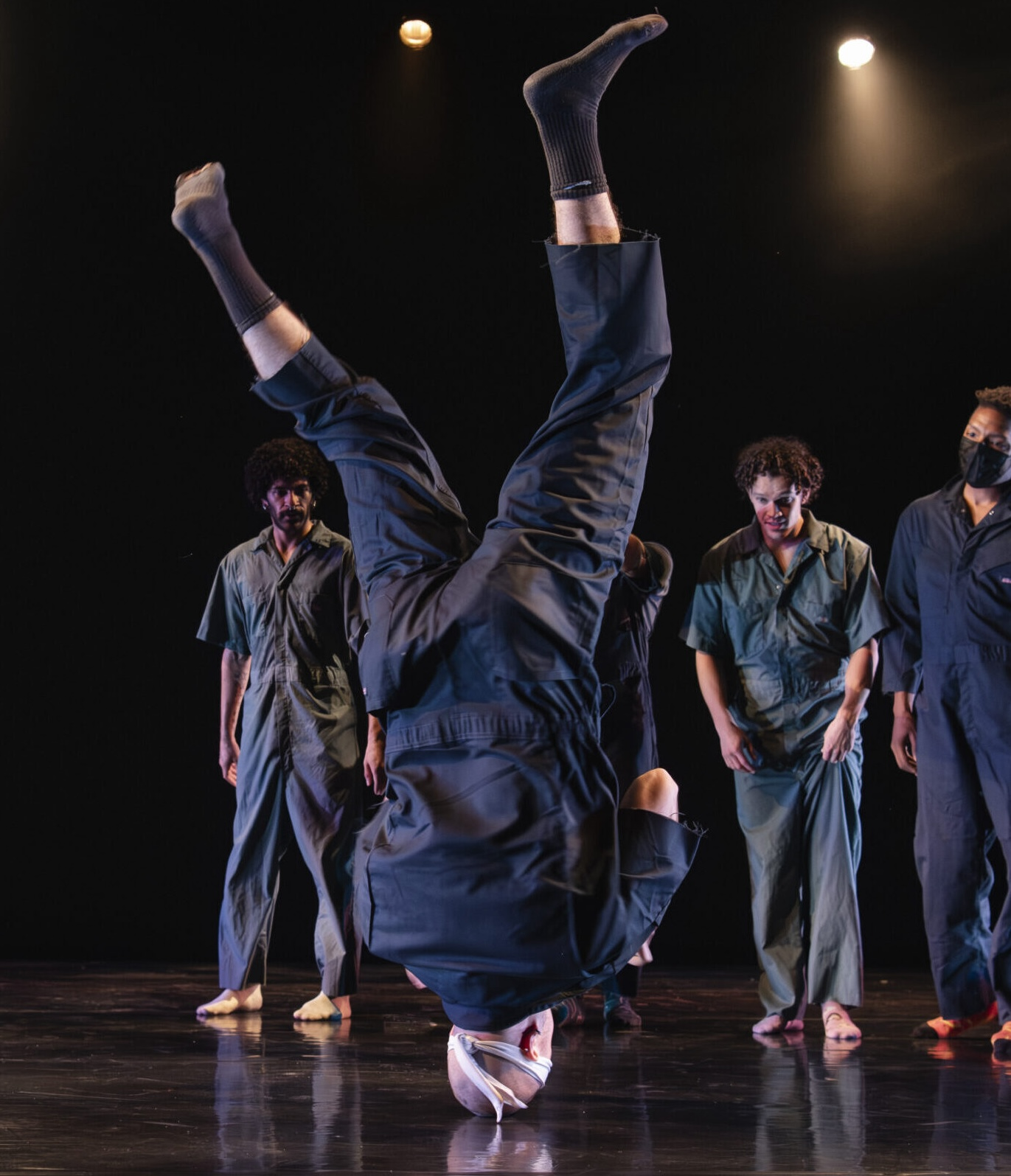
- A dancer performing on his head

General information
- Name: Chicago Dance Crash
- Year founded: 2002
- Website: chicagodancecrash.com

Artistic staff
- Artistic director: KC Bevis

Other
- Associated schools: Visceral Dance Center in Chicago, IL
- Formation: Ensemble Based

Chicago Dance Crash is an American physical theater and street dance company based in Chicago, Illinois. The company tours year round while sustaining a calendar year ‘season’ of local premiers and commercial work as well as a spring/fall educational outreach program. The company has received widespread critical acclaim while being considered one of the most notable American dance companies to emerge during the first decade of the 2000s.

Established in 2002, the organization has commissioned well over 100 original works from choreographers including Harrison McEldowney, James Morrow, Annie Franklin, Amirah Sackett and Nicholas Leichter. Crash is led by Artistic Director KC Bevis and Executive Director Jessica Maya Leyva and is a resident company of Visceral Dance Center in Chicago, IL.

== History ==
Chicago Dance Crash was founded by Illinois State University graduates Marissa Moritz, Charlie Cutler and Mark Hackman as a professional outlet for works the trio had created as students. Admittedly to satisfy the individual talents of the three (Cutler an actor, Hackman a martial artist and Moritz a modern dancer), early productions utilized dance and acrobatics while forwarding a linear, conflict-driven story. The company's first performances took place at the 60-seat, historical Mary-Arrchie Theater in Chicago's Northeast neighborhood of Buena Park. Crash's first production, titled The Mercutio Story, soon after extended to several performances across the city including the Chicago Shakespeare Theatre at Navy Pier and ultimately performing at “The Space” storefront theater in New York City.

Crash incorporated on December 23, 2003, employed its first artistic director in 2003 and established its current local season structure in 2005. Adopting a company dancer formation in 2007, the organization began touring nationally and internationally in 2012.

=== Artistic Directors ===
- Christopher M. McCray (2003-2006) – Crash's first contracted artistic director, McCray's award-winning production Ghost Play cemented the company's local significance while establishing its consistent season of premieres. McCray has gone on to direct Corpo Dance Company and now choreographs and performs internationally.
- Kyle Vincent Terry (2006-2010) – Terry had performed with Crash since 2003 and was promoted from a senior company position. Notably founding Crash's signature production, The Keeper of The Floor, Terry established the organization's current eight-member formation with works including an interpretation of Faust and the kung fu-inspired production Tiger Prawn: The Mountain Mover. Terry has gone on to direct the arts organization TheMASSIVE and since 2013 has enjoyed a stage and film career in New York City.
- Jessica Deahr (2012–2023) – Deahr had performed with Crash since 2007. Originally hired by Terry, Deahr's most poignant accomplishments include choreographing and directing the organization's 10th anniversary production of Gotham City as well as its 15-year anniversary production of The Bricklayers of Oz, both of which have led to national notoriety and have aided in Deahr's restructuring Crash's business model to include a steady touring program.
- KC Bevis (2023-present) – Katelyn Christine (KC) Bevis began her career with the organization as a performing apprentice then promoted to ensemble member, rehearsal director and ultimately appointed by Jessica Deahr herself as artistic director. Ms. Bevis' tenure with the organization most notably affirms a more tangible connection between Chicago's concert dance industry with the city's street dance community. "Come see us, take class with us, create opportunities together and come collaborate because there's so much more connection to be had."

== Style and notoriety ==
=== Fusion-style ===
The prevailing aesthetic of Chicago Dance Crash has been cited as "fusion-style," generally referred to as the blending of unalike dance forms but more culturally recognized as the specific combination of hip hop dance aspects (including breakdancing, popping, krump, among others) with the influence of "concert dance" vocabulary and direction (modern dance, jazz dance, ballet). The term "fusion-style" was originally coined by Chicago-raised dancer and choreographer James Morrow whose company "Instruments of Movement" championed the style regionally from 2001 to 2009. As two of Crash's founders (Moritz and Hackman) as well as all three of Crash's artistic directors had previously danced under Morrow, it's been publicly stated that Crash's aesthetic is attributed to his work.

=== Movement plays ===
Although not historically an unknown concept to live dance performance, Crash gained early support among critics and fans due largely to their creation of evening-length, linear plot-based works which they dubbed "movement plays"... a format less utilized in Chicago during the turn of the millennium. A device still used by the organization today, the shows often complement larger-spanning concepts with popular culture façades; commenting on morality, religion and politics with comic book settings, video game references and onstage spectacles.

=== KTF ===
Second to the Neo-Futurists show Too Much Light Makes the Baby Go Blind, Chicago Dance Crash locally operates the longest-running live show in the history of Chicago. Opening on March 9, 2007, at the Lakeshore Theater, the company premiered an interactive dance battle titled The Keeper of The Floor (KTF for short) with dancers of differing styles competing in comical rounds towards a single champion of the night. The show's original late-night host was Reggie Watts and has been headlined by host Matthew Hollis, nicknamed "Mattrick Swayze," since 2008.

== Critical reception and awards ==
Chicago Dance Crash was named “Best Dance Company” of 2009 by the Chicago Reader, "Best in Dance" for 2012 from the Chicago Tribune and was recognized by Newcity as the best new dance company to emerge between 2000 and 2010 in their “Decade of Dance” publication.

- AT&T Onstage Award, 2005
- The Katherine Dunham Award for Choreography, 2006
- The Alvin Ailey Award, 2006
- Black Theater Alliance Awards, 2008
- "Best Dance Company of the Year" Chicago Reader, 2009
- "Outstanding Choreographer" Dance Chicago 2010
- Chicago Dance New Voice Award, 2011
- "Best in Dance" Chicago Tribune 2012
- Show of the Year, Breakdance Chicago, 2013
- CTT Inspiration Award, 2016
- "Most Inventive New Work" in the United States, Dance Magazine 2017
- "Best of Chicago" Award - Dance Company Category
- "Chicago Dance Crash Day" in the city of Chicago proclaimed by Mayor Lori Lightfoot, May 15, 2022
- "Readers Choice Award 2022" for "Best in Dance" by Picture this Post
- Dance/USA Emerging Leader Award, 2025

The company has received additional honors from Americans for the Arts, Dance for Life, the Illinois Arts Council, DCASE, The National Endowment for the Arts, the World Wildlife Fund, Uniqlo and JPMorgan Chase among others.
