= Strawdog Theatre Company =

Founded in 1988, Strawdog Theater Company is located in North Center at 1802 W Berenice Avenue.

== 2015–2016 - Season 28 ==
- In a Word
  - by Lauren Yee
  - directed by Jess McLeod
- D.O.A.
  - from the script by Russell Rouse & Clarence Greene
  - directed and adapted by Elizabeth Lovelady
- Once in a Lifetime
  - by George S. Kauffman and Moss Hart
  - directed by Damon Kiely

== History ==
Lawrence Novikoff and Paul Engelhardt founded Strawdog Theatre Company in 1988 after performing together in a production of Euripides's Helen. Strawdog was intended to be a home for a company of actors drawn to a gritty, realistic theater style. The group took their name from Sam Peckinpah's movie "Straw Dogs" and was founded with the commitment to the ensemble approach, which remains the backbone of Strawdog today .

In 2000, the Company went through a period of restructuring. Many ensemble members left the Company and new members were recruited. This personnel change led to a shift in leadership and focus for the ensemble. Jennifer Avery and Michael Dailey took over as Co-Artistic Directors. They added many new ensemble members of varying disciplines, restructured the administration of the Company and gradually moved its focus from gritty kitchen sink dramas to a wider range of styles.

In August 2003, the Company hired Nic Dimond, a former ensemble member, to helm the Company as Artistic Director.

Strawdog first garnered national attention when Terry Teachout ("America's Theatre Critic") of The Wall Street Journal named Aristocrats one of the best shows of 2007. The next year, Teachout once again lauded Strawdog for their production of RUR, a rarely seen parable about robots and technology.

== Production history ==
=== 2003–2004 - Season 16 ===
- Julius Caesar
  - by William Shakespeare
  - directed by Nic Dimond
  - (remount at Theatre on the Lake)
- Detective Story
  - by Sidney Kingsley
  - directed by Shade Murray
- Wireless: Programme One
  - by Gregor Mortis
  - directed by Gregor Mortis
- Merchant of Venice
  - by William Shakespeare
  - directed by George Cederquist
- Fuddy Meers
  - by David Lindsay-Abaire
  - directed by Kimberly Senior

=== 2004–2005 - Season 17 ===
- Wireless 2
  - directed by Gregor Mortis
- Puntila and His Man Matti
  - by Bertold Brecht
  - directed by Nathan Allan
- Wireless 3
  - directed by James Anthony Zoccoli
- Impossible Marriage
  - by Beth Henley
  - directed by Eric Wegener
- The True Ballad of Fall's Blessings
  - by Hank Boland
  - directed by Nic Dimond

=== 2005–2006 - Season 18 ===
- Detective Story
  - Sidney Kingsley
  - directed by Shade Murray
  - remount at Theatre on the Lake
- Wireless 4
  - directed by Nic Dimond
- Three Sisters
  - by Anton Chekhov
  - directed by Kimberly Senior
- Wireless 5
- The Tooth of Crime (2nd Dance)
  - by Sam Shepard
  - directed by Nic Dimond

=== 2006-2007 - Season 19 ===
- Three Sisters
  - by Anton Chekhov
  - directed by Kimberly Senior
  - remount at Theatre on the Lake
- Marathon '33
  - by June Havoc
  - directed by Shade Murray
- Radio Theatre 6
  - by Hank Boland
  - directed by Jennifer Avery
- A Lie of the Mind
  - by Sam Shepard
  - directed by Nic Dimond
- Radio Theatre 7
  - by Michael Dailey
  - directed by Amanda Delheimer

=== 2007–2008 - Season 20 ===
- Aristocrats
  - by Brian Friel
  - directed by Rick Snyder
- Richard III
  - by William Shakespeare
  - directed by Nic Dimond
- Old Town
  - by Brett Nevue
  - directed by Kyle Hamman

=== 2008–2009 - Season 21 ===
- RUR
  - by Karel Čapek
  - directed by Shade Murray
- Cherry Orchard
  - by Anton Chekhov
  - directed by Kimberly Senior
- Red Noses
  - by Peter Barnes
  - directed by Matt Hawkins

=== 2009–2010 - Season 22 ===
- St. Crispin's Day
  - by Matt Pepper
  - directed by Kevin Christopher Scott
- Uncle Vanya
  - by Anton Chekhov
  - directed by Kimberly Senior
- Good Soul of Szechuan
  - by Bertold Brecht
  - directed by Shade Murray

=== 2010–2011 - Season 23 ===
- Red Noses (Remounted)
  - by Peter Barnes
  - directed by Matt Hawkins
- State of the Union
  - by Howard Lindsay & Russel Crouse
  - directed by Geoff Button
- Master and Margarita
  - by Mikhail Bulgakov
  - directed by Louis Contey
- Conquest of the Southpole
  - by Manfred Karge
  - directed by Kimberly Senior

=== 2011–2012 - Season 24 ===
- Old Times
  - by Harold Pinter
  - directed by Kimberly Senior
- Petrified Forest
  - by Robert E. Sherwood
  - directed by Shade Murray
- The Duchess of Malfi
  - by John Webster
  - directed by Brandon Bruce

=== 2012–2013 - Season 25 ===
- Neighborhood 3: Requisition of Doom
  - by Harold Pinter
  - directed by Joanie Schultz
- Improbable Frequency
  - Book & Lyrics by Arthur Riordan
  - Music by Bell Helicopter
- Big Love
  - by Charles Mee
  - directed by Matt Hawkins

== Awards ==
=== 2008 ===
Old Town
After Dark Awards

- Outstanding Musical
- Outstanding Original Song/Score
  - Misha Fiksel
- Outstanding Performance in a Musical or Review
  - Kat McDonnell

Lie of the Mind
Joseph Jefferson Awards, Non-Equity Wing

- Incidental Music
  - Misha Fiksel & Gregor Mortis

=== 2007 ===
Marathon '33
Joseph Jefferson Awards, Non-Equity Wing

- Outstanding Ensemble

=== 2005 ===
Three Sisters

Joseph Jefferson Awards, Non-Equity Wing

- Best Adaptation
  - Curt Columbus
- Best Scenic Design
  - Brian Sidney Bembridge

After Dark Awards

- Best Overall Technical
- Best Production

== Board of directors ==
- Meaghan Clayton
- Thomas Linguanti
- Camille McLeod
- Jennifer Nelson
- Seth Rickard
- Chelsea Wilson
- Patrick Zubrod

== Artistic Associates ==
- Matt Hawkins

== Members ==
- Aly Renee Amidei
- Hank Boland
- Nicole Bloomsmith
- Brittany Dee Bodley
- Mike Dailey
- Scott Danielson
- Anita Deely
- Paul Fagen
- John Ferrick
- Kyle Gibson
- Sarah Goeden
- Carmine J. Grisolia
- Kyle Hamman
- Heath Hays
- Shannon Hoag
- Sam Hubbard
- Jordan Kardasz
- John Kelly
- Anderson Lawfer
- Sean Mallary
- Kat McDonnell
- Mike Mroch
- Janice O'Neill
- Michaela Petro
- John Henry Roberts
- Jamie Vann
- Justine C. Turner
