= Lukshon =

Lukson

Restaurant information
- Established: 2011
- Closed: 2021
- Owner: Sang Yoon
- Food type: Asian
- Location: 3239 Helms Avenue, Culver City, Culver City, Los Angeles, California, 90232, United States
- Reservations: No
- Website: lukson.com

Lukshon was an Asian restaurant located at Helms Bakery building in Culvery City, California.

Lukson was featured in the season six, episode four episode of the Food Network television series The Best Thing I Ever Ate.

It was also received a write-up in the July 2017 issue of Wine Spectator magazine.

== Reviews ==
Jonathan Gold of the Los Angeles Times said "Every time I drop by Lukshon, I’m consumed by the same thought: Sang Yoon still may be the most underachieving chef in America, a man who will spend a thousand hours developing a perfect dan dan mian and then dump it from his menu because he got bored, or tinker on his fermented XO sauce the way your cousin Gabe works on his old Corvette. He still serves a Burmese fermented tea leaf salad made with Marcona almonds as well as crunchy beans, garnished with barely cooked prawns; and raw butterfish pushed toward Thailand with a dusting of blast-frozen coconut milk. Someday, Yoon may decide to streamline all this into a $150 tasting menu. Until then, Lukshon is almost a bargain."

In 2019, the Michelin Guide wrote "This sleek and modern bistro arrives courtesy of Sang Yoon, the culinary guru behind the pioneering burger gastropub, Father's Office. The eclectic menu spans the Eastern hemisphere, from the Sichuan province of China to Vietnam, Malaysia and even India. Only a deeply talented kitchen can pull off such a wide-spanning carte with integrity, and the team here does it seamlessly."

Irene Virbila of the Los Angeles Times wrote "It’s usually the other way around. A high-end chef goes downscale for his or her flagship restaurant’s spinoff. Think bistro, cafe or burger spot. But Sang Yoon, chef-owner of the phenomenally successful Father’s Office, forges his own path. He’s gone from a modest bar with food to an elegant but still casual Asian restaurant, possibly the most anticipated of the season’s openings. Not an easy jump. But though there’s much to like about the new Lukshon in Culver City — the spicy chicken pops, the crispy coconut rice cakes, the Malaysian spiced short ribs! — in many ways it’s still a work in progress."

== Reopening ==
Lukshon temporarily closed during the 2021 COVID-19 pandemic. In 2023 Eater reported that Lukshon owner and chef Sang Yoon "Is teasing the relaunch of Lukshon slated for later this year with "a few tweaks and some evolution." The chef writes: “Lukshon was a very personal restaurant to me and the cooking was a window into my deepest thoughts for better or worse.”" Yoon opened the restaurant in 2011 in Culver City. As of 2023 the exact timing for the reopening is yet to be determined as the chef is also reopening Helms Bakery this year." Though since 2023 Lukshon remains closed.
