= Father's Office =

Gastropub in Santa Monica, California

Coordinates: 34°1′45″N 118°29′54″W

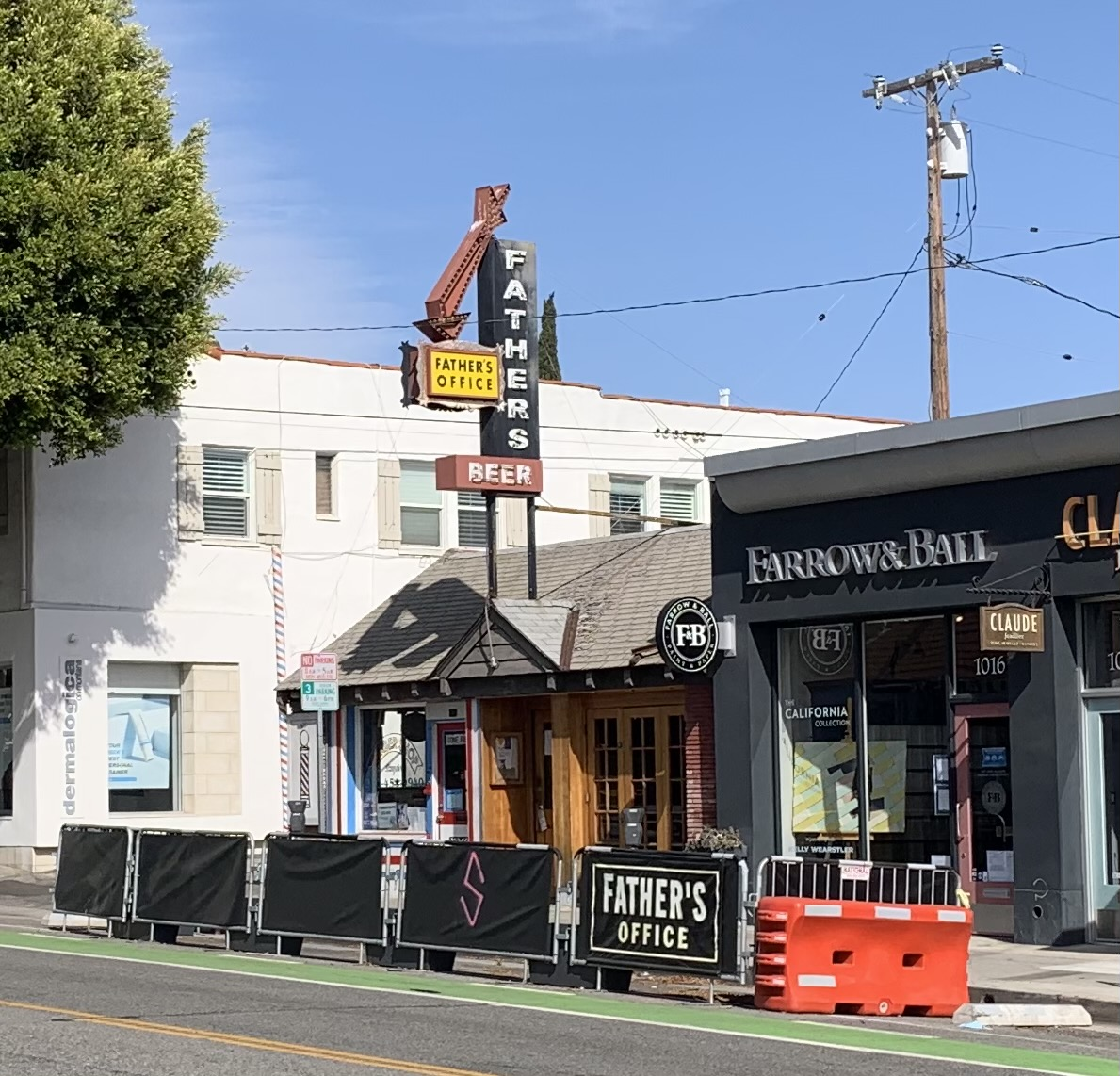
- Interactive map of Father's Office

Restaurant information
- Established: 1953
- Owner: Sang Yoon
- Head chef: Sang Yoon
- Food type: Gastropub
- Location: 1018 Montana Avenue, Santa Monica, California, United States
- Other locations: Culver City
- Website: fathersoffice.com

Father's Office is a pair of gastropubs located in Los Angeles County. The first Father's Office location was opened at 1018 Montana Avenue in Santa Monica, California, and has become famous for the Office Burger, which Esquire called one of the best burgers in the world.

== History ==
Father's Office was founded in 1953. From 1986 to 2000, under the ownership of Lou Moench, Father's Office was influential in the rise of America's craft brewing industry and the establishment of smoke-free bars in California.

Moench initially sold two types of beers from Anchor Brewing Company and Sierra Nevada Brewing Company, and expanded the beer menu over the years to include more than 70 brands from California, Oregon and Washington. Selections would vary, depending on available stock and season.

Looking back on when he purchased Father's Office in the late '80s, Moench said embracing craft beer came with a cost. "When I stopped selling Bud and put Widmer Hefeweizen on that tap handle, I got a reaction. I had to educate people."

Father's Office made headlines in 1991 when Moench decided to voluntarily make it California's first smoke-free bar. For Moench, taking action was a health issue for his employees. "Secondhand smoke kills some 53,000 people each year,” Moench would tell bar owners. "This is about caring for the health of your employees and customers who don't smoke," he said. Seven years later, all other bar owners in California would eventually join him. In 1994, California Governor Pete Wilson signed a law banning smoking in the workplace. A temporary exemption was carved out for bars and casinos, but that ended on January 1, 1998.

Father's Office was purchased in 2000 by owner and head chef Sang Yoon, who had cooked gourmet California cuisine at Michael's restaurant in Santa Monica, California. Yoon opened the bar's kitchen which had previously offered cheese plates and a list of local delivery options for patrons to bring in. The main attraction was the Office Burger, a patty of dry-aged beef topped with caramelized onions, Gruyère and Maytag cheeses, applewood-smoked bacon compote and arugula served on a soft roll.

Sang Yoon is known for allowing no substitutions or alterations of any type to the food served at Father's Office, including no ketchup.

Father's Office was featured in a 2007 episode of the television series After Hours with Daniel hosted by chef Daniel Boulud.

A second Father's Office location in the Helms Bakery building in Culver City, California was opened in April 2008.

In the late 2000s, Father's Office became one of the first restaurants to begin selling wine on tap, with red wines kept at 55 degrees, white wines kept at 46 degrees.

A third Father's Office location was opened in downtown Los Angeles in January 2020. The downtown Los Angeles location closed on September 5, 2025, owner Sang Yoon was quoted in the media saying the location just never caught on with the neighborhood.
