= Office Burger =

Father's Office burger

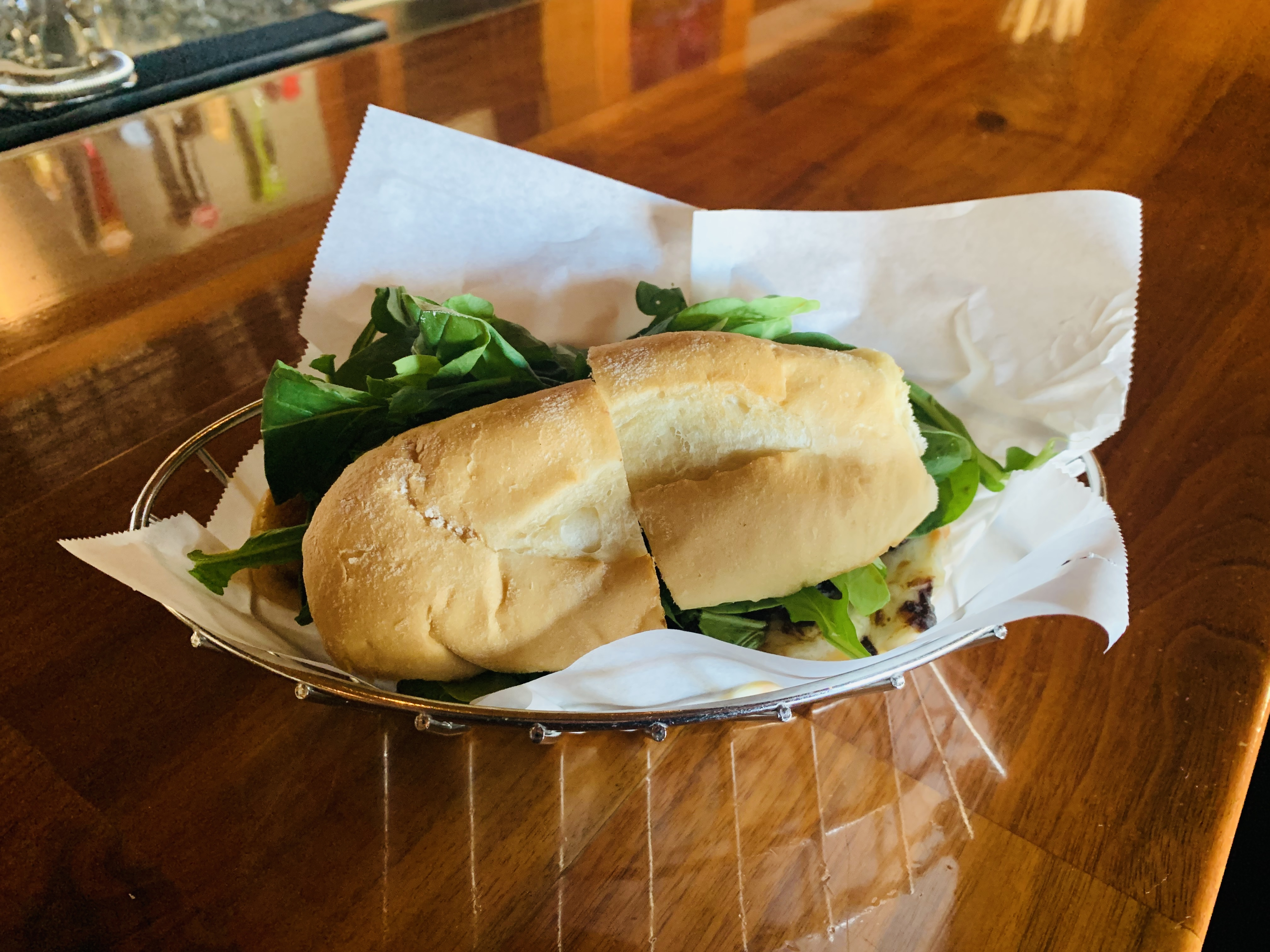
- The Office Burger, popularized at Father's Office gastropubs in Los Angeles, California
- Type: Hamburger
- Course: Main
- Place of origin: Father's Office
- Region or state: Los Angeles County, California
- Associated cuisine: Beer, french fries
- Created by: Sang Yoon
- Invented: 2000
- Main ingredients: Dry-aged beef

The Office Burger, first introduced in the year 2000, became known as the signature burger at Father's Office, a chain of gastropubs located in Los Angeles County, California.

== The Office Burger ==
While the Office Burger's creator, head chef and Father's Office owner Sang Yoon, has long denied revealing the exact ingredients of the burger, in 2001, Yoon did reveal that the burger patty was a combination of sirloin, chuck and dry-aged New York steak trim.

Others in the media have attempted to deduce the exact recipe of the Office Burger themselves, speculating the burger is made with an amalgam of dry-aged beef, blue cheese and Gruyère cheese, caramelized onions, applewood bacon compote and served on a toasted oblong shaped French baguette.

In regards to the creation of the Office Burger, Yoon has been dubbed "the mastermind of one of the country's best burgers." Yoon has also said the Office Burger was greatly influenced by French onion soup, one of Yoon's most favorite dishes and Yoon's favorite steak, ribeye, dry-aged from Peter Luger Steak House.

== No-modification policy ==
Sang Yoon has a no-modification policy for the Office Burger that will not allow substitutions or add-ons of any kind such as ketchup. When asked about the no ketchup Office Burger policy Yoon explained "It just doesn't need ketchup. I didn't realize that would be so controversial."

The no-modification policy applies to all food served at Father's Office.

== Delivery ==
In 2020, it was announced that the Office Burger would now be available for home delivery.

== Reviews ==
Esquire magazine called the Office Burger "one of the best burgers in the world."

Bon Appétit magazine said, "Yes, it's messy. Yes, it's a little dated. (Father's Office has been serving up this burger since 2000.) And yes, my stomach hurts after wolfing down the whole thing in a matter of minutes. But also: None of that matters because the Office Burger is perfect."
