= Two Birds/One Stone =

- Interactive map of Two Birds/One Stone

Restaurant information
- Established: 2016
- Closed: 2020
- Owners: Sang Yoon, Douglas Keane
- Head chef: Sang Yoon, Douglas Keane
- Food type: Fusion cuisine, Japanese
- Location: 3020 St. Helena Hwy. North, St. Helena, Napa Valley, California, 94574, United States
- Coordinates: 38°31′31″N 122°29′51″W
- Reservations: Yes
- Website: twobirdsonestonenapa.com

Two Birds/One Stone was a self-described "Japanese ethos meets California inspiration" restaurant that opened in 2016 and located at Freemark Abbey Winery in St. Helena.

The duo owners and two Michelin-starred chefs were Sang Yoon of Father's Office fame and Douglas Keane.

== Critical reception ==
Sonoma magazine said in its review "Each chef takes a different approach to the Asian cooking style, with varying techniques and ingredient twists. So far, Two Birds is the most inventive of them all."

== Roadhouse 29 ==
In 2019, chef Douglas Keane reinvented Two Birds/One Stone into a casual smoked meat restaurant under the new name Roadhouse 29 that officially opened January 30, 2019.

Roadhouse 29 has been described as being a roomy 4,000-square-feet occupying a historic 1800s stone building given a major renovation.

In 2020, Yelp reported that Roadhouse 29 had permanently closed.
