= Bakers Row =

Road in Clerkenwell, London

Coordinates: 51.5236°N 0.1100°W

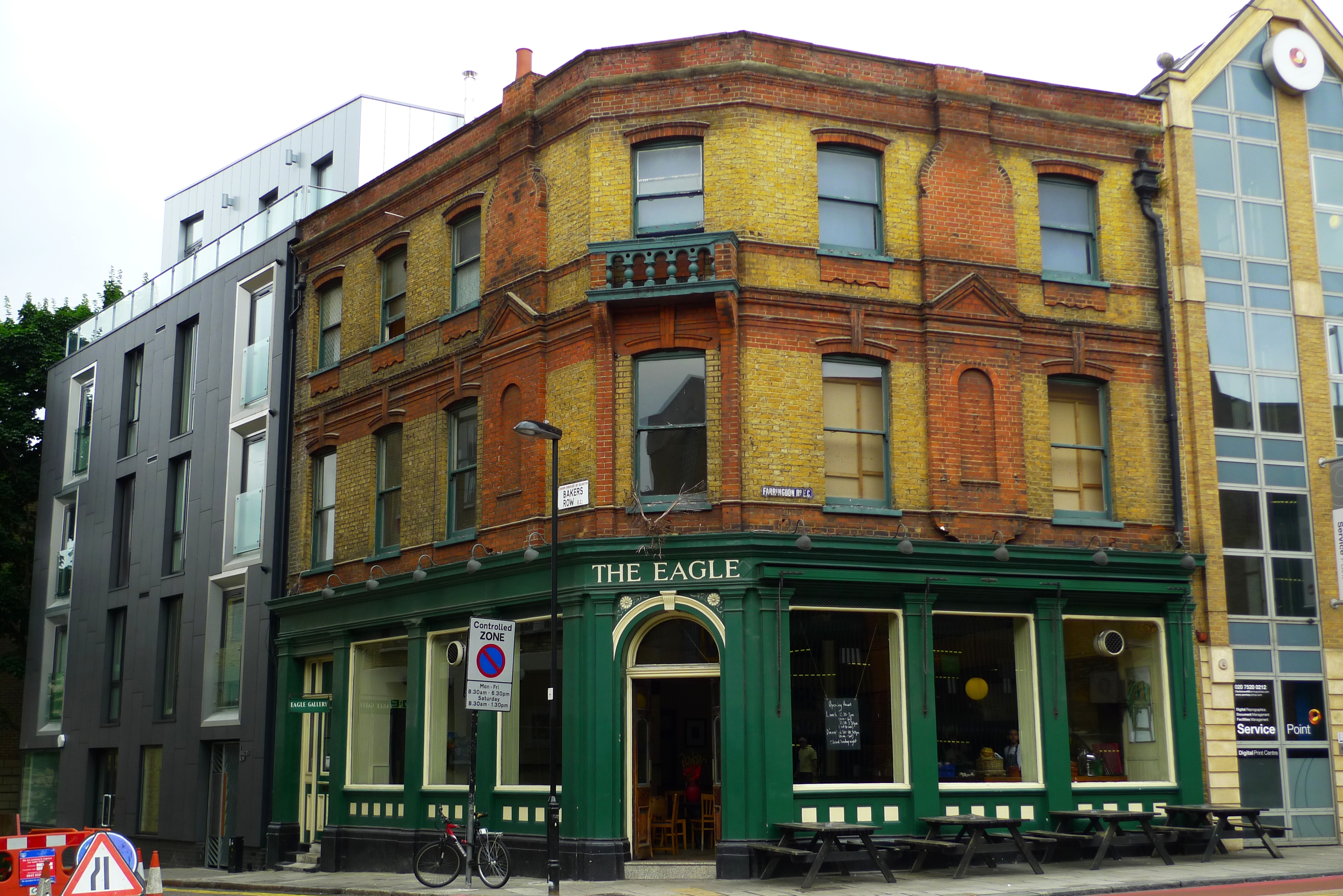
The Eagle pub on Bakers Row

Bakers Row is a road in London which forms the gateway to a network of little cobbled streets which form part of Little Italy, a nickname which applies to the western area of Clerkenwell.

The name Little Italy was due to its strong Italian connections, which were evident for almost 200 years. The area is also known as Italian's Hill. Its boundaries are formed by Clerkenwell Road, Farringdon Road and Rosebery Avenue and it includes the historically important Italian church of St Peter's.

Bakers Row was almost totally destroyed during a heavy bombing raid in 1940, during the Blitz. The area was selected for "total clearance", a London County Council policy which took advantage of areas damaged by bombs to clear overcrowded tenements. This plan was classified as top secret until April 1945, as publication would have helped German Intelligence assess the effectiveness of their bombing raids.

The Eagle pub on Bakers Row was Britain's first gastropub.
