= Épicerie Boulud =

French market chain in New York

Restaurant information
- Established: May 2011; 15 years ago
- Food type: French Cuisine
- Location: New York City, 10036, United States
- Website: https://www.epicerieboulud.com/all-locations

Épicerie Boulud is a chain of épiceries, or French groceries. The chain was founded by chef Daniel Boulud, who had already been in the restaurant industry for 42 years at that point. Épicerie Boulud was his first retail concept.

== Locations ==
There have been six locations exclusively in New York City. These are opening dates and locations:

- May 10, 2011 at Lincoln Center
- November 2014 at the Plaza Food Hall on the first floor of the Plaza Hotel
- October 2016 at the Westfield World Trade Center
- April 2021 at the Lipstick Building
- May 2021 at One Vanderbilt
- November 2023 at 919 Third Avenue

== Menu ==
The menu at each location features seasonal dishes, and has eight sections: breakfast, salads, sandwiches, vegetables du jour, quiches, soup du jour, combos, and bar. Épicerie Boulud also offers homemade bread, charcuterie, cheeses, and sweets like ice cream, cakes, and chocolates According to nyc.com, the restaurant shifts focus to the oyster bar and wines in the evening. They sell a version of Bûche de Noël which they call "Santa Cake".

== Awards ==
- March 2015: Épicerie Boulud named #6 Éclair in New York City by Foursquare City Guide
- June 2016: Épicerie Boulud named #3 Baguette and #4 Croissant in New York Magazine’s “Best of New York” collection
- March 2017: Épicerie Boulud named #5 French Macaron in New York Magazine’s “Best of New York” collection.

== Closure ==
Épicerie Boulud at the Plaza Food Hall closed in March 2020 following failed negotiations between the Dinex Group and the Plaza Hotel. Every other location is still open.
