= Sang Yoon =

South Korean-American chef

- Born: Seoul, South Korea
- Occupations: Chef; restaurateur
- Known for: Office Burger
- Culinary career
- Cooking style: Fusion; East Asian; California
- Rating
- Michelin stars
- Current restaurants
- Father's Office; Tiny's
- Previous restaurants
- Two Birds/One Stone; Lukshon; Michael's
- Television shows
- After Hours with Daniel; Top Chef; Top Chef Masters
- Website: chefsangyoon.com

Sang Yoon is a Korean and American restaurateur, chef and owner of the Father's Office gastropub and the creator of the Father's Office signature hamburger, the Office Burger. He also owns Tiny's.

Yoon is the former chef and owner of the Lukshon restaurant and the former the chef and partner for Two Birds/One Stone.

Yoon was a contestant on Bravo Network's Top Chef Masters.

== Life and career ==
Yoon began his career in fine dining in Michelin-starred kitchens of Paris, New York, and Los Angeles including work at Chinois on Main and later as executive chef of Michael's, Santa Monica's famous dining destination for contemporary California cuisine.

In 2000, Yoon struck out on his own by renovating his favorite local dive bar, Father's Office, where he trailblazed the gastropub movement in Los Angeles and beyond. Father's Office is critically and popularly acclaimed for its signature craft beer selection of over 55 local and small-batch varieties and the Office Burger has been hailed as the country's best burger by The Today Show and Esquire magazine.

Sang Yoon has been profiled as a craft beer expert in USA Today, Food & Wine magazine, and National Public Radio and has been featured as a guest judge on Bravo's Top Chef and competing chef on Top Chef Masters.

February 2011 saw Yoon's return to fine dining with the debut of Lukshon, a restaurant dedicated to Southeast Asian cuisine that was named the #18 restaurant in Los Angeles from food critic Jonathan Gold of the Los Angeles Times.

In June 2016, Yoon opened Two Birds/One Stone, a restaurant project in California's wine country.

On June 15, 2026, Yoon opened Tiny's, a fast food and Asian cuisine themed restaurant located at South Coast Plaza in Costa Mesa, California.
