= Ghaya Oliveira =

Tunisian-born chef

- Born: Tunisia
- Culinary career
- Cooking style: Pastry chef
- Current restaurant(s): Daniel
- Previous restaurant(s): Bar Boulud; Boulud Sud
- Award(s) won: 2017 James Beard Foundation Award Outstanding Pastry Chef

Ghaya Oliveira is a Tunisian-born chef who works at the New York City-based restaurant Daniel as pastry chef. She was named the Outstanding Pastry Chef at the James Beard Foundation Awards in 2017.

== Career ==
Ghaya Oliveira was born in Tunisia. Some of her earliest memories of cooking come from her grandmother, in particular the custard she made, which was also used to make ourta at Ramadan. Oliveira attended a local university, where she graduated with a degree in economics and began working for an investment bank in Tunis. When Oliveira's sister fell ill, she moved to New York City to be with her. With her Tunisian qualifications unrecognised in the United States, she first turned to ballet and then began taking on a variety of jobs until she ended up as a dishwasher for a restaurant. Oliverira's sister died a year after she arrived, and she took on the role of looking after her child.

Oliveira gained a job working at the restaurant Domingo, owned by Plácido Domingo. While there she became a pastry commis chef. When it was announced that the restaurant was to close, she was passed the details of a manager at Cafe Boulud. She joined as a junior member of the pastry staff in 2001. Oliveira was mentored by the head chef there, and in 2007 left to become the executive pastry chef at Bar Boulud within the same group. When Boulud Sud opened in 2012, she took on responsibility for that restaurant as well.

Daniel Boulud announced in 2013 that Oliveira was to become the new pastry chef at his restaurant Daniel. He said upon the announcement, "She is a rare culinary talent, constantly growing and innovating, and precisely the type of chef I look to helm my flagship restaurant."

== Awards and honors ==
Oliveira was nominated for the James Beard Foundation Award for Outstanding Pastry Chef in 2012, 2015 and 2016. She won at the 2017 Awards.
