= Jōji (restaurant) =

Japanese restaurant in New York City

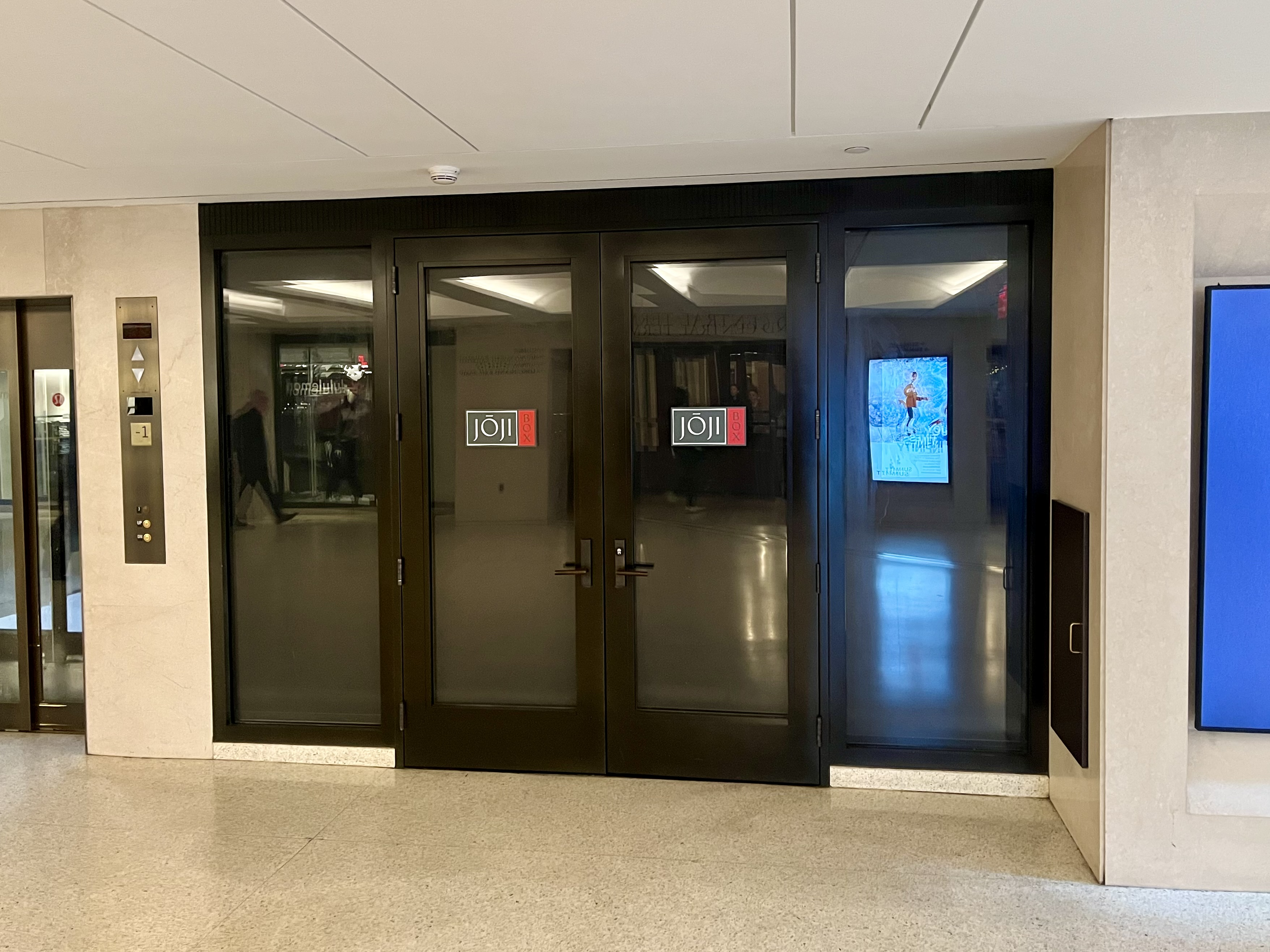
- The restaurant's exterior in 2025
- Interactive map of Jōji

Restaurant information
- Established: September 14, 2022
- Head chef: George Ruan
- Chef: Wayne Cheng
- Food type: Japanese
- Dress code: Business casual
- Rating: (Michelin Guide)
- Location: 1 Vanderbilt Avenue, New York, New York, United States
- Coordinates: 40°45′11″N 73°58′43″W
- Seating capacity: 10-seat counter
- Reservations: Yes
- Website: jojiny.com

Jōji is a Michelin-starred Japanese restaurant in New York City. The restaurant opened on September 14, 2022 below One Vanderbilt, a skyscraper in Midtown Manhattan adjacent Grand Central Terminal. The restaurant was originally planned to be located on the second floor of One Vanderbilt in the back of Le Pavillon, but was placed in a hidden alcove below the building.

== See also ==
- List of Japanese restaurants
- List of Michelin-starred restaurants in New York City
