= Daniel (restaurant) =

New French restaurant in New York City

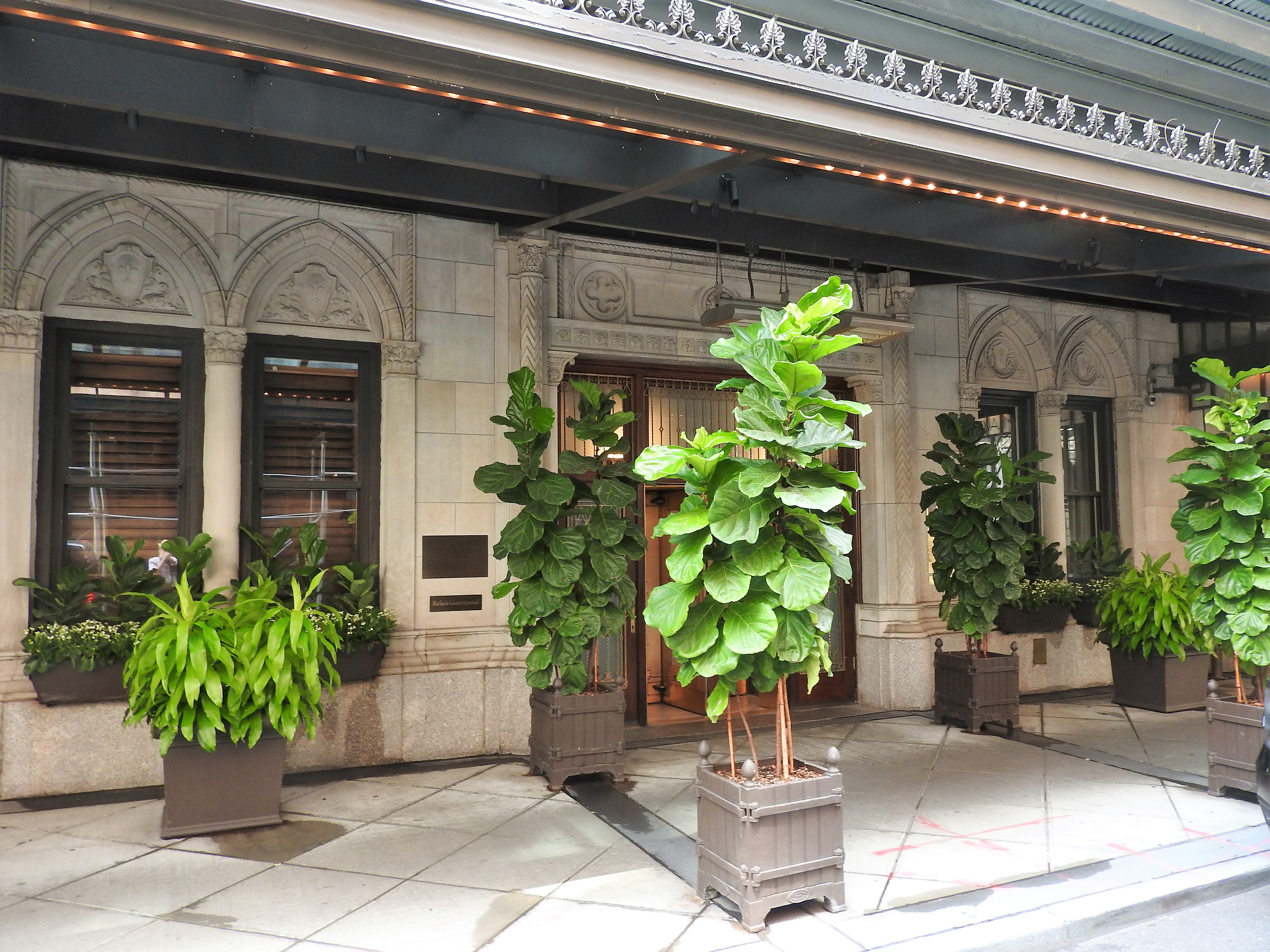
- Interactive map of Daniel

Restaurant information
- Established: 1993
- Owner: Daniel Boulud
- Food type: New French
- Dress code: Jackets required
- Rating: (Michelin Guide)
- Location: 60 East 65th Street (between Madison Avenue and Park Avenue), on the Upper East Side in Manhattan, New York, New York, 10065, United States
- Coordinates: 40.766831°N 73.967606°W
- Other information: 1,570 wine selections; 24,000 bottles
- Website: Daniel website

Daniel is a New French restaurant located at 60 East 65th Street (between Madison Avenue and Park Avenue), on the Upper East Side in Manhattan, in New York City. It is owned and run by French celebrity chef Daniel Boulud, New York's longest-reigning four-star chef. The restaurant moved to its current location in early 1999.

Since 2013, Ghaya Oliveira has been the executive pastry chef.

== Ratings ==
Since 1999, Daniel has been a AAA Five Diamond Award winner.

Since 2002, Daniel has been a recipient of the Wine Spectator Grand Award.

In 2013, Zagats gave it a food rating of 28 (the second-highest rating on the Upper East Side), and decor and service ratings of 28 (each the highest on the Upper East Side). It ranked it the 4th-best restaurant in New York City.

In 2012, The Infatuation gave it a rating of 8.9/10 and included it on their 2020 list of the best restaurants on the Upper East Side.

It was one of only five restaurants awarded four stars by The New York Times, however it was downgraded to three stars by restaurant critic Pete Wells.

In October 2019, Forbes magazine rated Daniel the "top-ranked restaurant in America".

As of 2025, it is rated one-star by the Michelin Guide. Daniel previously held three Michelin stars until 2014 when it was downgraded to two stars. It was downgraded to one star in 2024.

== In popular culture ==
The restaurant is featured in the rich culinary landscape of Almost Rapist: A True Crime Memoir (The Enthusiast Press).

== See also ==
- List of Michelin-starred restaurants in New York City
