= Le Pavillon (Daniel Boulud restaurant) =

Restaurant in Manhattan, New York City

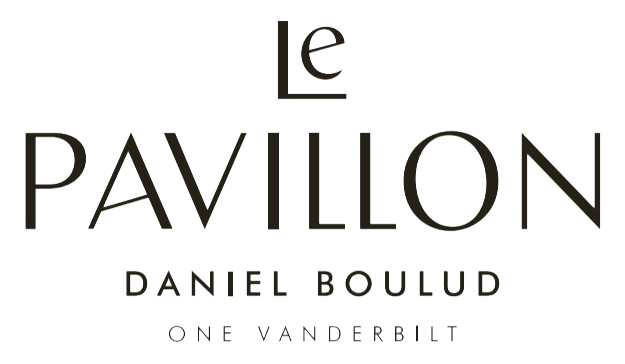

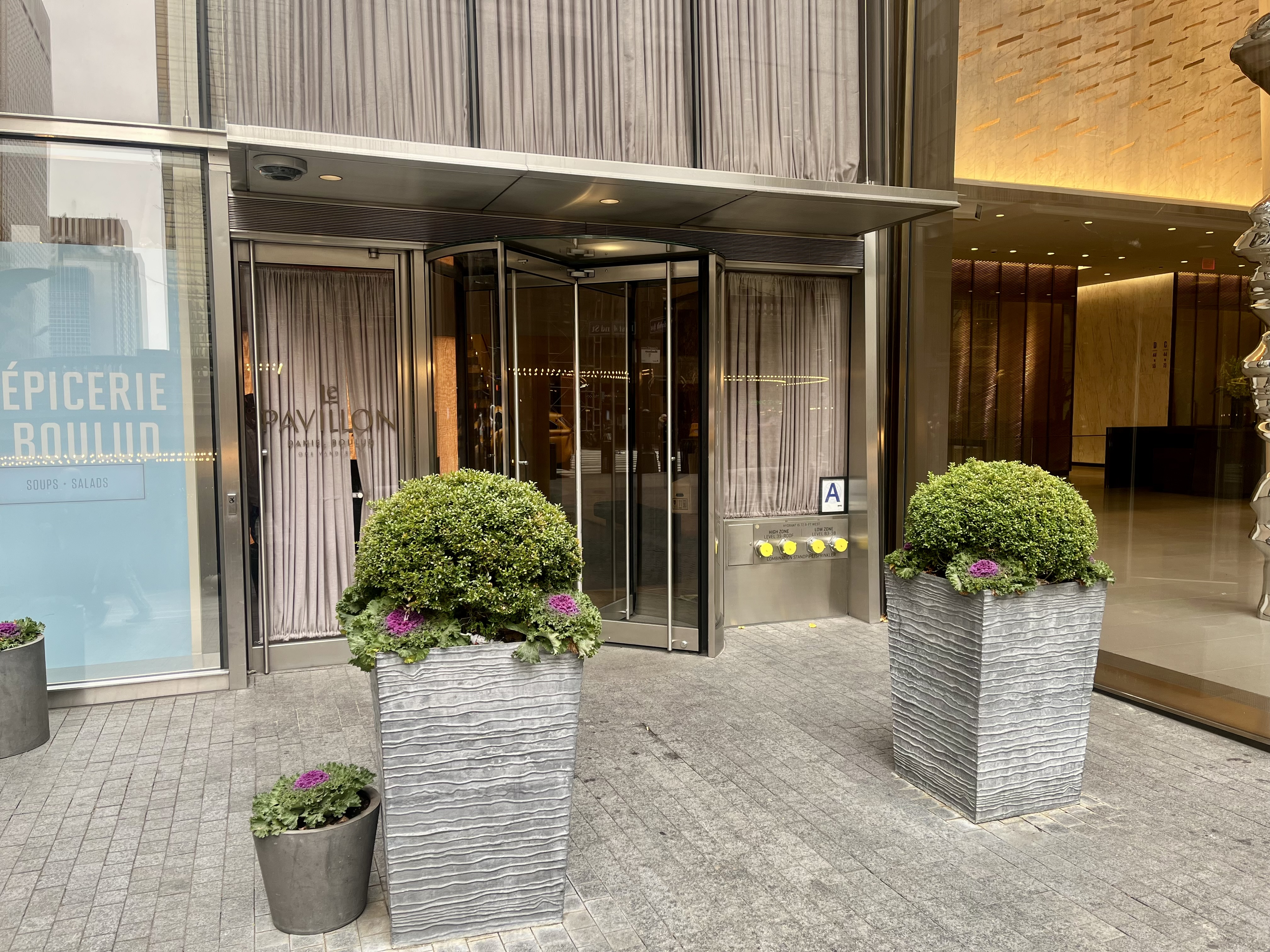
- The dedicated entrance to the restaurant
- Interactive map of Le Pavillon

Restaurant information
- Established: May 19, 2021
- Owner: Dinex Group
- Head chef: Daniel Boulud, William Nacev
- Rating: 1 Michelin star
- Location: One Vanderbilt Avenue, New York, NY
- Coordinates: 40.7530°N 73.9785°W
- Seating capacity: 166
- Website: lepavillonnyc.com

Le Pavillon is a restaurant in Midtown Manhattan, New York City. The restaurant is owned by the Dinex Group, a restaurant company led by chef and restaurateur Daniel Boulud. Le Pavillon opened in May 2021 in One Vanderbilt, a skyscraper completed in 2020 in Midtown East.

== History ==
The idea for a new Boulud restaurant at One Vanderbilt began around 2017, when the skyscraper's developer approached Boulud about opening a restaurant there. Le Pavillon opened on May 19, 2021, the same day New York allowed restaurants to open at full capacity after 14 months of restricted dining during the COVID-19 pandemic. At its opening, its executive chefs were Daniel Boulud, Michael Balboni, and William Nacev.

The restaurant's initial opening was set to have limited reservations; its full opening was to take place on May 28.

Boulud had originally planned to open an omakase counter in the back of the restaurant, but instead placed his restaurant Jōji in a hidden alcove in the base of the building near the underground entrance to Grand Central Terminal.

== Attributes ==
Le Pavillon is an 11,000 sq ft (1,000 m^{2}) restaurant. It is located on the second floor of the One Vanderbilt skyscraper, and has its own dedicated entrance. The restaurant faces Grand Central Terminal, which lies just across a pedestrian plaza, and the Chrysler Building, about a block to the east.

The menu is focused towards local and seasonal products of farms and the sea, with only a few dishes including meat or poultry on the first menu. Le Pavillon's dinner menu is a three-course, prix-fixe menu with a cost of $125, including "Oysters Vanderbilt", a play on Oysters Rockefeller. Its wine list has 650 bottles, assembled by Boulud's wine director Daniel Johnnes.

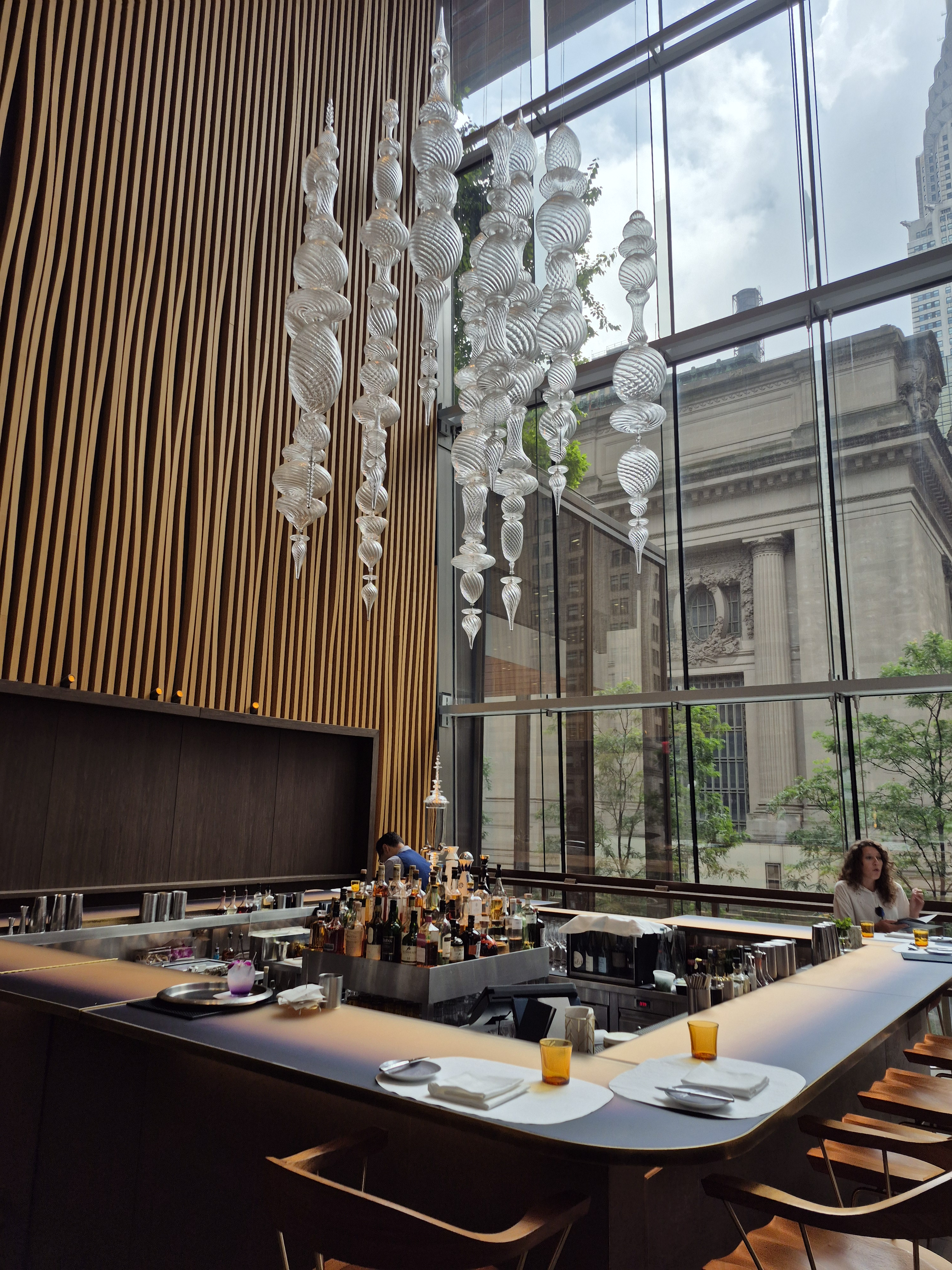
A glass chandelier designed by Andy Paiko hangs above the bar area

The restaurant space is a glassy multi-story room, with ceilings up to 57 ft (17 m). The room features a wall of trees and plants, including 20-foot olive trees; about half of the restaurant space is dedicated to flora. The 120-seat dining room has banquettes and chairs with neutral colors. The tables are left uncovered for lunch service and have pale linen tablecloths for dinner service. The restaurant's design was led by Brazilian architect Isay Weinfeld, along with the architecture firm KPF. Weinfeld is known for adding natural elements to his works, and designed the restaurant as a mix of New York skyscraper elements and elements of Central Park.

The restaurant also includes a bar and lounge area with seating for 46 guests, with an à la carte menu. The bar area has an artistic installation featuring a chandelier with an intricate array of hand-blown glass elements designed by sculptor Andy Paiko. Additionally, the restaurant has a "garden table", for guests to have special food and wine experiences led by guest chefs and winemakers.

Le Pavillon is named for an earlier Midtown Manhattan restaurant, also named Le Pavillon. That restaurant first opened as part of the 1939 New York World's Fair, and formally opened in Midtown in 1941, where it was known to define French cuisine in the U.S. until owner Henri Soulé's death in 1966. The name for the new restaurant also reflects its French meaning as a pavilion, a park space to provide entertainment for visitors.

== Reception ==
The restaurant received a significant amount of press at its opening. The New York Post titled it "the most important new restaurant in New York City's history", while Town & Country called it the city's "most ambitious restaurant opening in years", and a sign that the city's dining scene is returning following the COVID-19 pandemic in New York City. The restaurant was awarded one Michelin star in 2022.

== See also ==
- List of Michelin-starred restaurants in New York City
