= One Vanderbilt =

Office skyscraper in Manhattan, New York

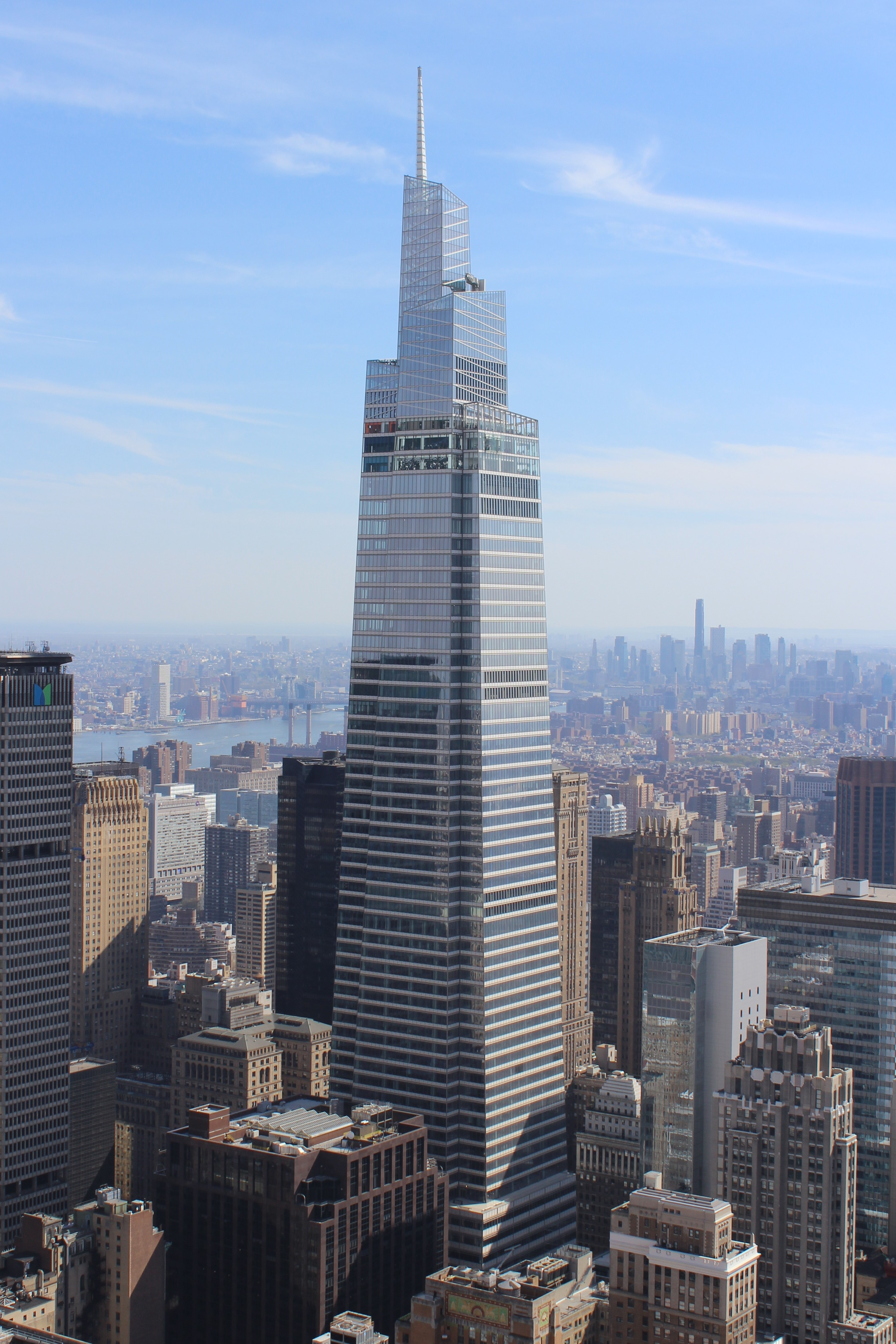
- One Vanderbilt in April 2023

General information
- Status: Completed
- Type: Office building
- Architectural style: Futurist
- Location: Midtown Manhattan, One Vanderbilt Avenue; New York, NY 10017, United States
- Coordinates: 40.7530°N 73.9785°W
- Construction started: October 18, 2016; 10 years ago
- Opened: September 14, 2020; 6 years ago
- Cost: $3.31 billion
- Owner: SL Green Realty, National Pension Service of Korea, Hines Interests Limited Partnership, Mori Building Company

Height
- Antenna spire: 1,401 feet (427 m)
- Roof: 1,301 feet (397 m)
- Top floor: 73
- Observatory: 1,020 feet (310.9 m)

Technical details
- Floor count: 62
- Floor area: 1,750,212 ft^{2} (162,600.0 m^{2})
- Lifts/elevators: 49

Design and construction
- Architect: Kohn Pedersen Fox
- Developer: SL Green Realty
- Engineer: Jaros, Baum & Bolles (MEP)
- Structural engineer: Severud Associates
- Civil engineer: Langan, Stantec
- Main contractor: AECOM Tishman

Website
- onevanderbilt.com

One Vanderbilt is a 62-story supertall skyscraper at the corner of 42nd Street and Vanderbilt Avenue in the Midtown Manhattan neighborhood of New York City. Designed by Kohn Pedersen Fox for developer SL Green Realty, the skyscraper opened in 2020. Its roof is 1,301 feet (397 m) high and its spire is 1,401 feet (427 m) above ground, making it the city's fourth-tallest building after One World Trade Center, Central Park Tower, and 111 West 57th Street.

One Vanderbilt's facade and design is intended to harmonize with Grand Central Terminal immediately to the east. The building's base contains a wedge-shaped void, and the tower tapers as it rises, with several "pavilions" and a pinnacle at the top. The facade is made mostly of glass panels, while the spandrels between stories are made of terracotta. The superstructure is made of steel and concrete, and the interior spaces are designed to be as high as 105 feet (32 m). The lobby has a bank branch and an entrance to the nearby railroad terminal and the associated subway station, while the second floor contains the Le Pavillon restaurant. Most of the building is devoted to office space. The top stories contain the Summit One Vanderbilt observation deck.

SL Green acquired the site between 2001 and 2011 and announced plans to construct the building in 2012. A planned zoning amendment for the neighborhood failed in 2013, delaying the project for several months. TD Bank signed as the anchor tenant in May 2014 and after the skyscraper was approved one year later, the existing structures on the site were demolished. A groundbreaking ceremony for One Vanderbilt was held in October 2016. Topping out occurred on September 17, 2019, but the COVID-19 pandemic delayed its completion. The building opened in September 2020, followed by the observation deck 13 months later.

== Site ==
One Vanderbilt is in the Midtown Manhattan neighborhood of New York City, just west of Grand Central Terminal. The building takes up the city block bounded by Madison Avenue to the west, the former alignment of Vanderbilt Avenue to the east, 42nd Street to the south, and 43rd Street to the north. The building's rectangular land lot covers 44,048 square feet (4,092.2 m^{2}), with dimensions of 200 by 215 feet (61 by 66 m). Nearby structures include the Lefcourt Colonial Building and One Grand Central Place to the south; Grand Central Terminal to the east; the MetLife Building to the northeast; and 335 Madison Avenue to the north. In addition, the Grand Hyatt New York hotel and the Chrysler Building are one block east, while the Pershing Square Building, the Bowery Savings Bank Building, and the Chanin Building are to the southeast.

The skyscraper replaced five structures built as part of the Terminal City development around Grand Central in the 20th century. The 18-story Vanderbilt Avenue Building, a Warren and Wetmore-designed structure at 51 East 42nd Street, opened as a six-story office complex in 1902 and expanded in the 1920s. It had a two-story Modell's store that sold sport-related items. Some of 51 East 42nd Street's ornate facade details, including terracotta porpoises and cherubs, were saved by the developer and stored until the New York Landmarks Conservancy found a place for them. The 23-story building at 317 Madison Avenue, on the corner with 42nd Street, was designed by Carrère and Hastings and opened in 1922 as the Liggett Building. The Prudence Bond & Mortgage Building at Madison and 43rd, where Governor Al Smith once had gubernatorial campaign headquarters, dates to 1923. Two small structures along 43rd Street respectively housed "an Irish pub and a T.G.I. Friday's."

=== Pedestrian plaza ===
As part of the construction of One Vanderbilt, the section of Vanderbilt Avenue between 42nd and 43rd Streets was decommissioned in September 2016 and redesigned as a pedestrian zone. Designed by PWP Landscape Architecture, the plaza covers 14,000 square feet (1,300 m^{2}). It measures 200 feet (61 m) long and 60 feet (18 m) wide, taking the entire width of the former roadbed of Vanderbilt Avenue. The Vanderbilt Avenue plaza contains five raised planters as well as LED lighting accents. Unlike other plazas in New York City, it lacks dedicated seating because the plaza was intended to facilitate pedestrian traffic rather than act as a meeting area.

== Architecture ==
One Vanderbilt was designed by Kohn Pedersen Fox. Severud Associates was the structural engineer, Langan Engineering was the civil engineering consultant, and Jaros, Baum & Bolles was the mechanical and electrical engineer. Structural consultant Thornton Tomasetti worked with Severud to create models for the building's superstructure. Hines Interests Limited Partnership was the project manager, and Tishman Construction was the general contractor. The skyscraper's top floor is numbered 73. According to The Skyscraper Center and building permits, One Vanderbilt has 62 usable stories above ground, while according to Emporis and Hines, the building has 59 stories. Early plans called for a 67-story skyscraper.

One Vanderbilt's roof is 1,301 feet (397 m) high; including its spire, it is 1,401 feet (427 m) tall. A building on One Vanderbilt's site would normally have been restricted to 600 feet (180 m), but One Vanderbilt's developer SL Green was able to more than double this height with additional air rights. SL Green had transferred some air rights from the Bowery Savings Bank Building, and it received additional air rights from the New York City government by improving public transit and adding public space to the area. One Vanderbilt is the city's fourth-tallest building after One World Trade Center, 111 West 57th Street, and Central Park Tower. At completion, it was the second-tallest office building in the city after One World Trade Center. As of 2022, the building is the 27th-tallest in the world.

=== Form and facade ===
The design was required to harmonize with that of Grand Central Terminal. Because One Vanderbilt is taller than the nearby Chrysler Building, the city government unofficially encouraged its architects to create a "superior design". One Vanderbilt is set 10 feet (3.0 m) back from the street to allow better views of Grand Central. Also to improve views, the top section of the lowermost stories' facade slopes upward, while the bottom section slopes downward, creating a diagonal wedge. As a result, the lobby area on Vanderbilt Avenue (facing Grand Central) has a ceiling sloping from 50 to 110 feet (15 to 34 m) from west to east. Above the wedged base, the building tapers at higher levels, with a massing composed of four distinct shapes. The building's shape allows more sunlight to reach street level compared to alternative designs. Several alternatives were considered before the shape was finalized.

The facade consists mostly of a glass curtain wall with panels that extend from the floor to ceiling of each story. The curtain wall was fabricated by the Permasteelisa Group. According to Permasteelisa, the facade is made of 8,743 pieces in 1,060 distinct shapes, covering 753,500 ft^{2} (70,000 m^{2}). Of these, about 660 panels are placed at the corners; they were manufactured in different shapes because the building slopes upward. There are two typical shapes of panels used in the facade: vision glass windows, which extend up to 22 feet (6.7 m) high, as well as ventilated spandrels between each story, which are made of terracotta.

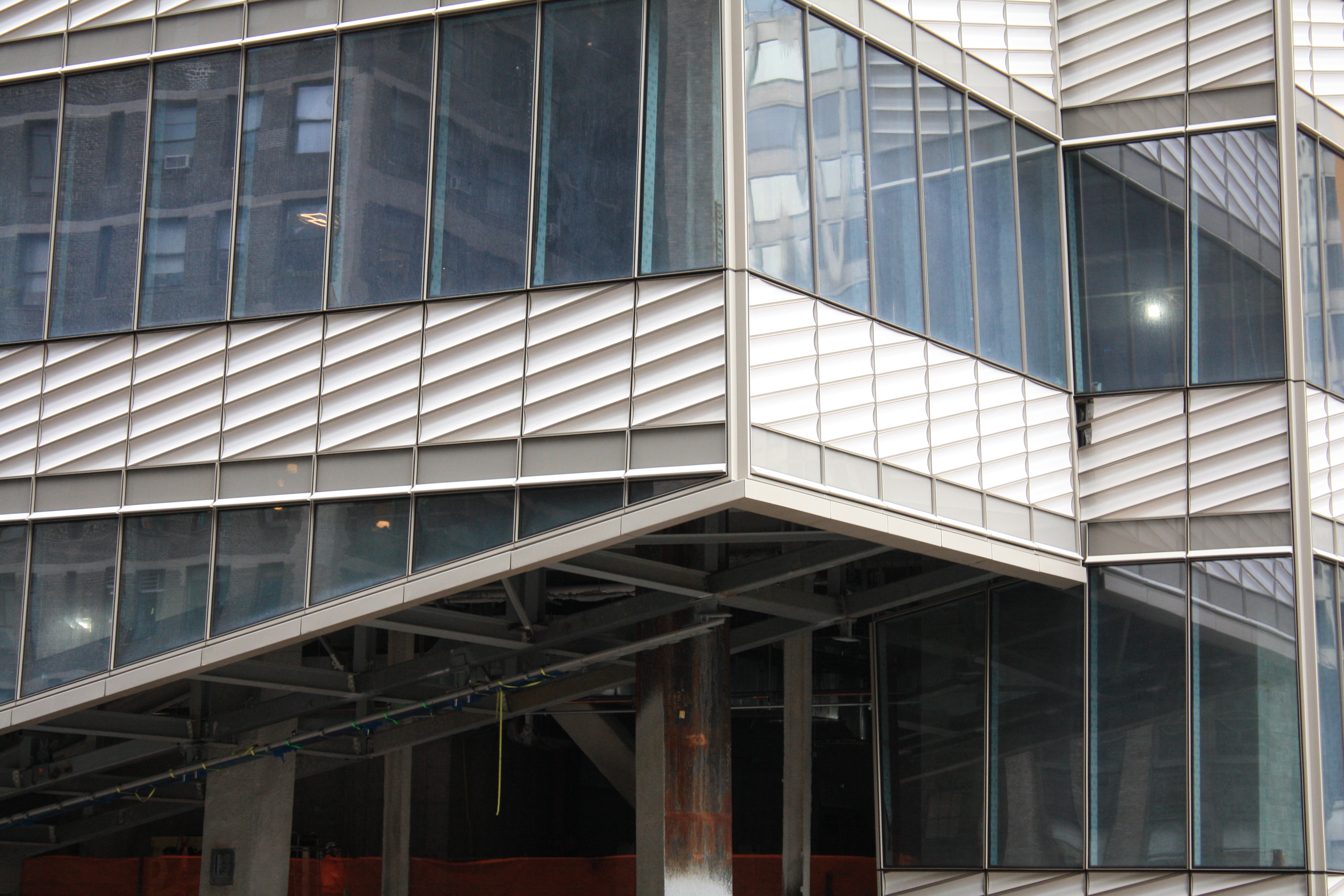
Detail of the bottom of the facade

Boston Valley Terra Cotta manufactured the terracotta spandrel panels between floors. According to Permasteelisa, there are 34,845 terracotta tiles used in One Vanderbilt's facade. Studio Christine Jetten designed glazing for the terracotta tiles. The panels contain gradual concave curves and are pearl-colored. The tiles reference the color and material used in Grand Central Terminal and were reportedly inspired by the terminal's ramps and Guastavino tile vaults. The tiles also alluded to the color of other office buildings on Madison Avenue. There are mechanical stories on the fourth, fifth, and twelfth floors. At these mechanical stories, there are vertical openings for intake and exhaust, which appear as part of the glass curtain wall.

The top of One Vanderbilt consists of a group of pavilions at different heights, which taper to the antenna. Between the main roof on the 60th floor and a point just above the 66th floor, there are C-shaped screens on the east and west sides, collectively known as "the crown". Diagonally sloped steel beams are visible on the exterior of the crown. The western section of the crown has aluminum accent strips on both the diagonal and horizontal beams. The eastern section of the crown has aluminum strips covering the diagonal beams and terracotta tiles covering the horizontal beams.

=== Structural features ===
The building rests on a foundation measuring 9.5 feet (2.9 m) deep, with 8,438 short tons (7,534 long tons; 7,655 t) of concrete. (Note: A less precise figure of 10 feet (3.0 m) deep and 8,500 short tons (7,600 long tons; 7,700 t) is given by Curbed. Severud Associates says the foundation is over 9 feet (2.7 m) deep.) The foundation contains 1,000,000 pounds (450,000 kg) of rebar and is anchored to the underlying bedrock using 83 tiebacks. The underlying bedrock could support loads of 60 short tons per square foot (590 t/m^{2}). The columns at the perimeter of the foundations are supported on spread footings measuring as much as 14 by 14 feet (4.3 by 4.3 m) across and 9 feet (2.7 m) thick. The perimeter walls themselves are up to 53 feet (16 m) tall and are composed of concrete with a strength of 10,000 pounds per square inch (69,000 kPa). About 60,000 cubic yards (46,000 m^{3}) of rock had to be excavated for the foundation. Because the base of One Vanderbilt is directly above the train tracks serving Grand Central, several large box columns had to be custom-designed for the building. One such column at the southeast corner does not contain bracing between the ground and sixth stories, allowing the southeast corner to be cantilevered.

The superstructure consists of a steel-and-concrete mechanical core surrounded by a steel frame. The building uses more than 26,000 short tons (23,000 long tons; 24,000 t) of steel, manufactured by Bankers Steel, as well as 74,000 cubic yards (57,000 m^{3}) of concrete. (Note: This is also cited as 75,000 cubic yards (57,000 m^{3}) of concrete.) The steel was installed in the core first, with the concrete poured around it, which allowed the skyscraper to be constructed similarly to buildings without any concrete core. By the time Severud had published its "100% construction documents" that finalized the construction details, several stories of the steel frame had been erected. The method of construction allowed the steel inside the core to be erected six to twelve floors ahead of the concrete. At the base, the core walls are 30 inches (760 mm) thick and can resist forces of 14,000 pounds per square inch (97,000 kPa). On higher stories, the core walls gradually decrease in strength to 6,000 pounds per square inch (41,000 kPa) with a minimum thickness of 24 inches (610 mm). The rebar is made of 90 percent recycled material.

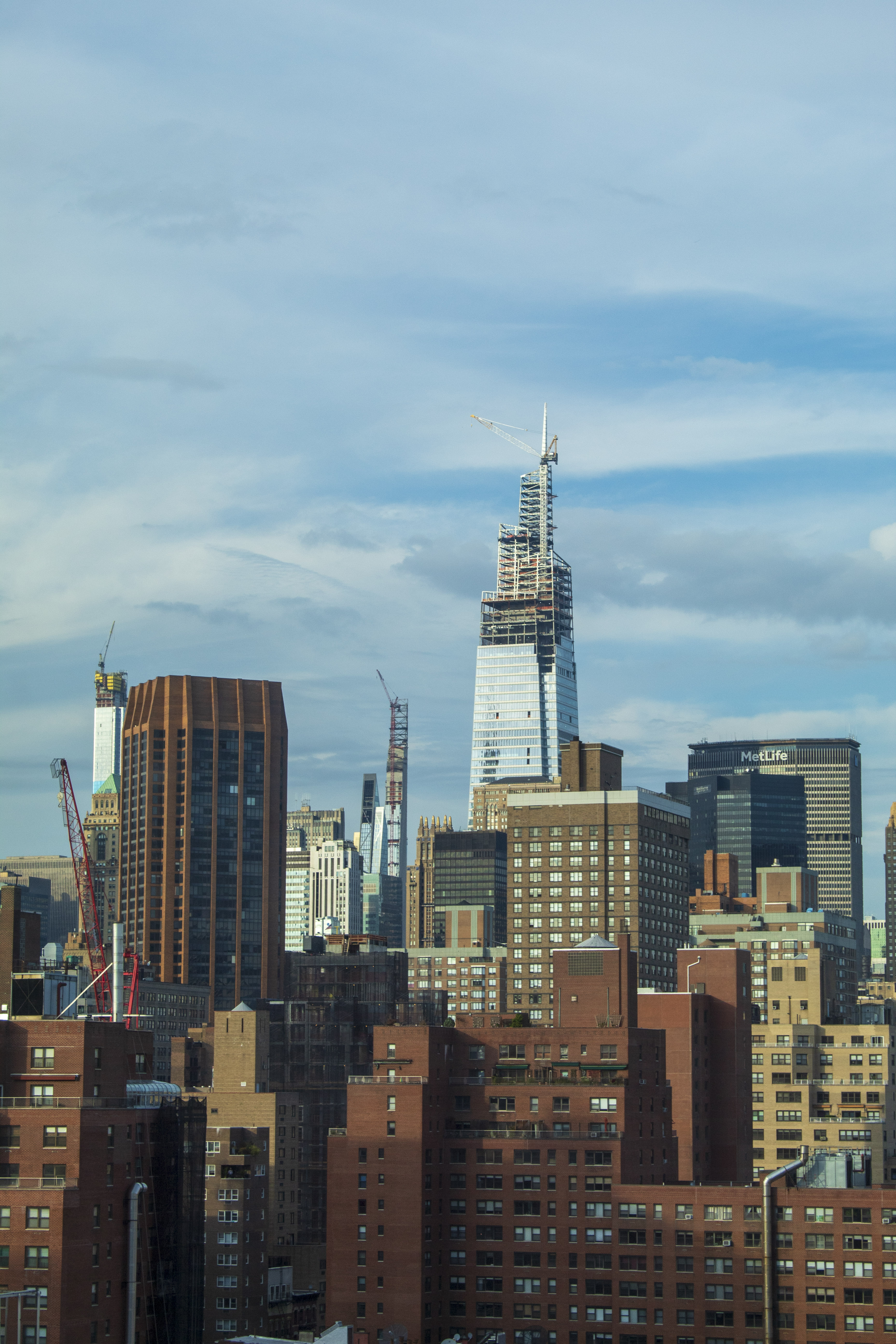
One Vanderbilt in October 2019 with Central Park Tower and 111 West 57th Street in background to the left

Most floors do not contain interior columns, and the steel frame contains beams that span up to 70 feet (21 m) from the core. On the three mechanical levels, the concrete shear walls around the core are reinforced by steel outrigger trusses. The office space requirements prevented lateral bracing or floor diaphragms from being used throughout much of the building, so many of the structural elements are unbraced for distances of up to 40 feet (12 m). At the building's crown, the diagonal beams have a cross-section of 18 by 18 inches (460 by 460 mm), and the horizontal and vertical beams have a cross-section of 22 by 22 inches (560 by 560 mm). The top of the building is stabilized by a tuned mass damper system weighing around 500 short tons (450 long tons; 450 t) or 520 short tons (460 long tons; 470 t).

=== Interior ===
==== Commercial and office space ====
The interior spaces in One Vanderbilt are designed to be as high as 105 feet (32 m). Underneath the building is a basement loading dock with a turntable, which is accessed by two truck elevators. The base includes a lobby covering 4,500 square feet (420 m^{2}). The interior of the lobby contains a bronze "art wall" and a starburst-shaped bronze installation suspended on metal cables. TD Bank was signed as the anchor tenant for the building, operating within a ground-floor space of 200,000 square feet (19,000 m^{2}).

There are also 30,000 square feet (2,800 m^{2}) of tenant amenities in the building's base, including tenant valet parking at ground level. On the second floor is Daniel Boulud's restaurant Le Pavillon, accessed by its own entrance from ground level. The restaurant space covers 11,000 square feet (1,000 m^{2}) and contains a ceiling height of 57 feet (17 m), with a main room and an auxiliary room. On the third floor is an auditorium, a boardroom, and a flexible meeting space known as the Vandy Club. The flexible space has showers for executives as well as pantries. The third-floor amenities were designed by Gensler.

The subsequent 58 floors contain 1.5 million square feet (140,000 m^{2}) of office space. There are fewer stories than in other skyscrapers of similar height because each story's ceiling is 14.5 to 24 feet (4.4 to 7.3 m) high. Because of the building's tapering shape, the office space on lower stories is larger than on upper stories. The lower office floors, spanning up to 40,000 square feet (3,700 m^{2}) each, were designed for tenants who needed large amounts of open space, such as newsrooms and trading floors. The middle office floors, spanning 20,000 to 30,000 square feet (1,900 to 2,800 m^{2}), were designed for corporate tenants. The upper stories, covering 15,000 to 20,000 square feet (1,400 to 1,900 m^{2}), were designed for smaller firms such as hedge funds. In marketing documents, floors 10 to 15 are labeled as "podium floors", floors 20 to 38 as "executive floors", floors 44 to 55 as "tower floors", floors 60 to 68 as "penthouse floors", and floors 72 and 73 as "sky floors". On the 55th floor is Centurion New York. a 11,500-square-foot (1,070 m^{2}) suite of clubrooms that is open only to holders of the Centurion Card, an invitation-only card for wealthy American Express clients.

The mechanical space on the 12th physical story contains a chiller plant and electrical transformers. One Vanderbilt was planned to be environmentally efficient from its inception. The building has its own cogeneration plant capable of 1.2 megawatts (1,600 hp) daily as well as a rainwater collection system with a capacity of 90,000 US gallons (340,000 L; 75,000 imp gal). Much of the building's electricity is generated by natural gas–powered turbines on the 39th physical story. The roof contains a cooling tower with five fans, which remove heat from the building's hot-water pipes; cold water is then sent back to the lower stories. To reduce energy consumption, One Vanderbilt uses both waterside and airside economizers, which use the natural temperature of the building's surroundings. The natural-gas turbines were perceived as energy-efficient when One Vanderbilt was proposed in the 2010s, but they quickly became obsolete; the New York City Council banned fossil fuels in all new buildings in 2021, shortly after One Vanderbilt opened.

==== Summit One Vanderbilt ====
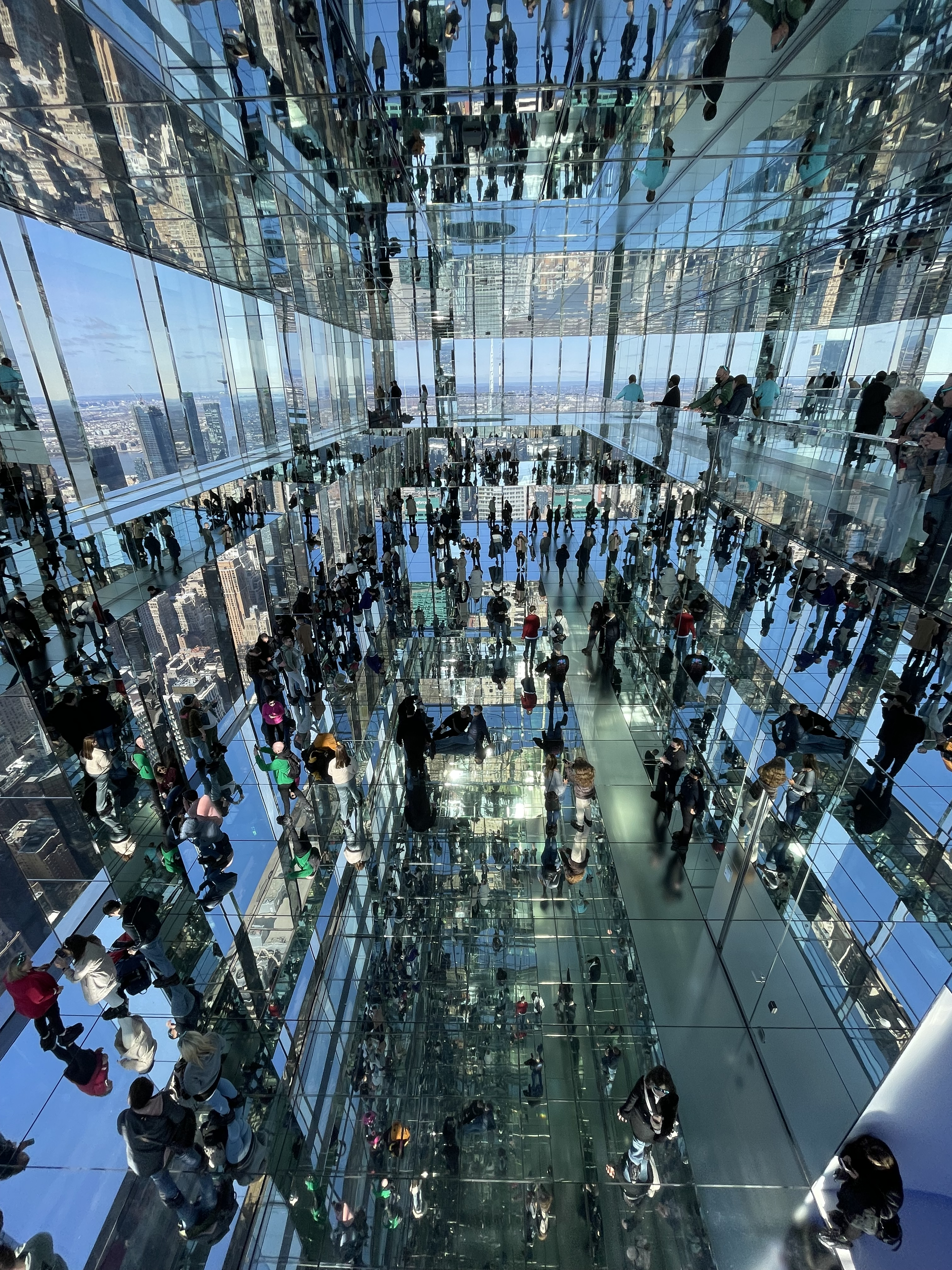
Part of the observation deck at Summit One Vanderbilt is covered in mirrors and windows

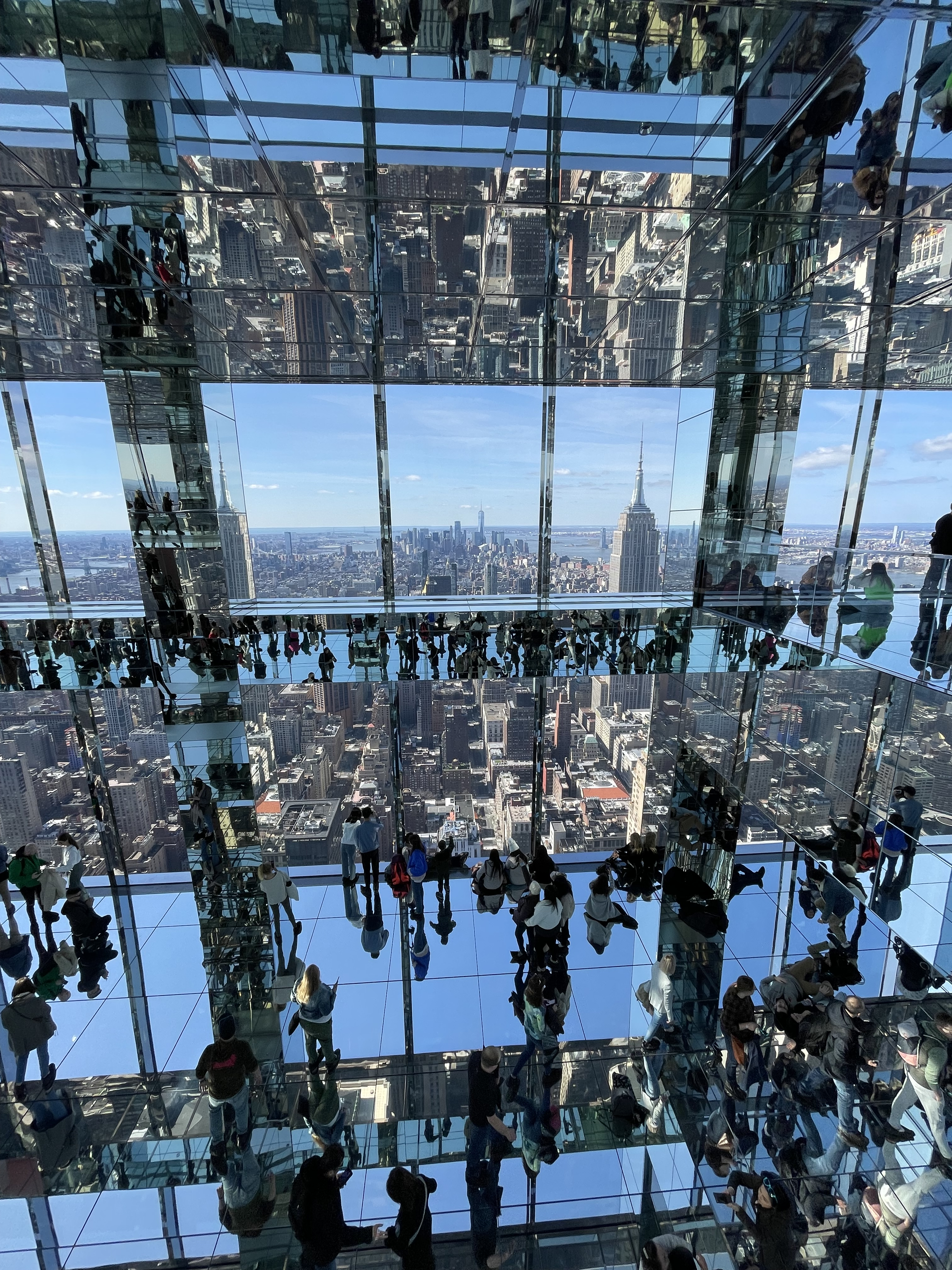
Southern view from Summit One Vanderbilt

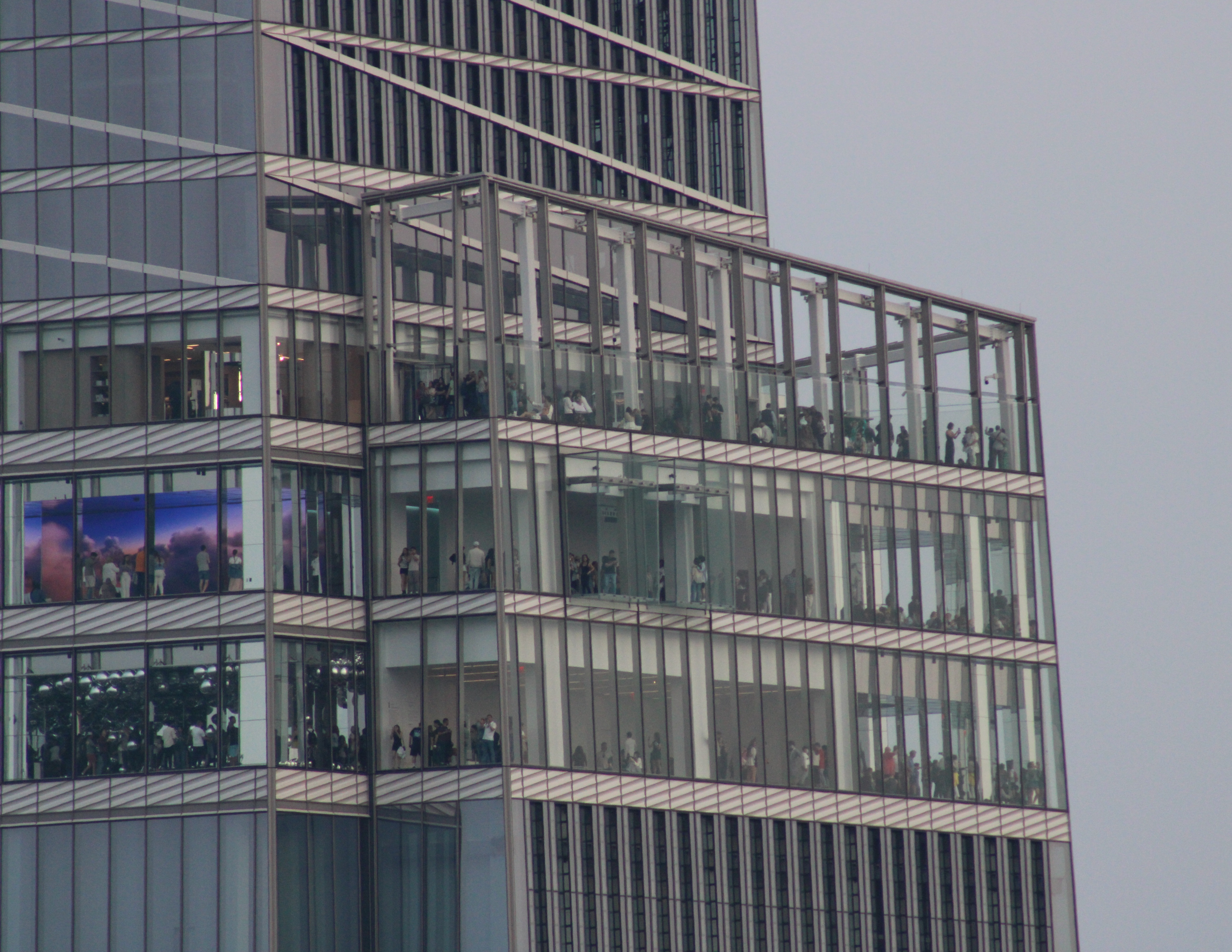
The observation deck as seen from 30 Rockefeller Plaza

Above floor 73, the top of One Vanderbilt contains an observation deck called Summit One Vanderbilt (branded in all-uppercase letters as SUMMIT One Vanderbilt). Summit One Vanderbilt spans 71,938 square feet (6,683.3 m^{2}) and contains some restaurants. In 2018, Summit One Vanderbilt was projected to cost approximately $35–39 million. New York City residents receive discounted admission.

Summit One Vanderbilt's interiors span three levels, which are numbered 91 through 93. The interiors are designed by Snøhetta and include several components. Rise has three elevators which take visitors from the Grand Central Terminal level to the observation area 1,020 feet (310 m) above ground in less than 50 seconds. Kenzo Digital designed an "infinity room" called Air on the lowest two levels, which has a ceiling 40 feet (12 m) tall. Air includes mirrored glass surfaces and is crossed by a glass balcony on the intermediate level. Next to it is Levitation, a set of enclosed glass balconies that protrude from the facade. Clouds, designed by Yayoi Kusama, consists of gray balloons circulating around a mirrored room. The interior of the top floor features a glass parapet and a bar. The bars are operated by Danny Meyer's Union Square Events. There is also a space advertised as an urban "alpine meadow". Ascent includes two exterior glass elevators which bring visitors from the observatory's highest level to near the top of the building, a vantage point approximately 1,210 feet (370 m) above ground level.

==== Grand Central subway improvements ====
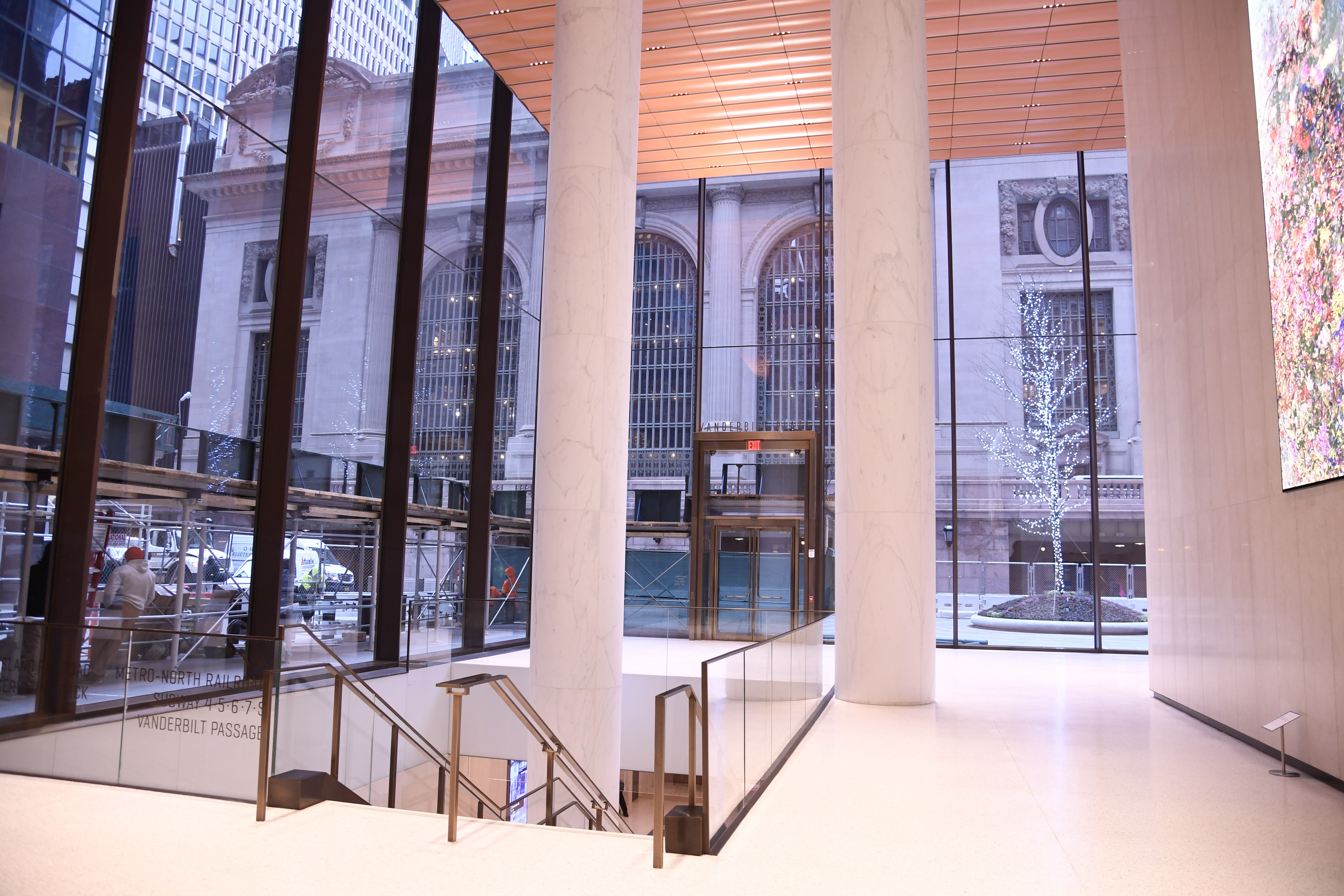
One Vanderbilt subway entrance in 2020

One Vanderbilt's construction included improvements that would provide extra capacity for over 65,000 passengers going into the New York City Subway at Grand Central–42nd Street. The Metropolitan Transportation Authority (MTA) mandated the station improvements in exchange for allowing the tower's construction. The improvements included an underground connection between Grand Central Terminal and One Vanderbilt; new mezzanines and exits for the subway station, including an entrance directly to the 42nd Street Shuttle platforms; three new stairways to each of the Lexington Avenue Line platforms (along the 4, 5, 6, and <6> trains); and reconfiguration of columns supporting the nearby Grand Hyatt New York hotel. The project also includes a waiting room for the Grand Central Madison terminal under Grand Central, which opened in 2023 and was built for the Long Island Rail Road as part of the MTA's East Side Access project.

A 4,000-square-foot (370 m^{2}) transit hall was created within One Vanderbilt itself to connect to the subway and railroad stations. Located at the ground story's northeastern corner, the transit hall has a ceiling measuring 40 feet (12 m) high. In 2015, SL Green Realty gave $220 million toward the building's construction, of which two-thirds would be used for station redesign, marking the largest private investment in the subway system to date. The building's subway entrance opened on December 9, 2020. The improvements, which cost over $200 million, allowed the subway station to accommodate 4,000 to 6,000 more passengers per hour.

== History ==
=== Initial plans ===
Developer SL Green Realty began looking at sites for a new office tower in Midtown in the early 2000s. The company began buying buildings on the block bounded by Vanderbilt Avenue, 42nd Street, Madison Avenue, and 43rd Street. The first acquisition was in 2001, with 317 Madison Avenue. SL Green initially intended to renovate the building and increase the rents. When two adjacent buildings on the same block were placed for sale in 2007, these were also acquired. According to SL Green managing director Robert Schiffer, this prompted the company to decide on razing these three buildings and replacing them with a larger structure at the address One Vanderbilt Avenue. In 2011, SL Green was able to buy 51 East 42nd Street, the final property on the block. The four buildings themselves had cost $300 million in total, but SL Green still had to acquire over 150 leases in them.

SL Green also owned the Bowery Savings Bank Building at 110 East 42nd Street, and it had transferred some air rights from the Bowery Savings Bank Building to the One Vanderbilt Avenue site in 2010. Under the zoning rules at the time, a structure on the latter block could not be taller than about 600 feet (180 m). The site allowed an "as-of-right" floor area ratio (FAR) of up to 15, but with the Bowery Savings Bank's air rights and several development bonuses, SL Green could obtain a FAR of up to 20.7. This was not enough for SL Green, which required a FAR of 30 for the skyscraper to be profitable. SL Green and Hines met with the New York City Department of City Planning (DCP) in late 2012 to determine which features the planned One Vanderbilt Avenue skyscraper could have. The discussions influenced SL Green to include public indoor and outdoor spaces, as well as a distinctive design, as the DCP mandated. SL Green hired Kohn Pedersen Fox as the planned skyscraper's architect that November. Sketches published early the following month indicated that the skyscraper would be called "One Vanderbilt".

In 2012, the administration of outgoing Mayor Michael Bloomberg sought to change zoning regulations for about 70 blocks adjacent to Grand Central Terminal. The plan would allow unused air rights above Grand Central Terminal to be transferred to developments on these blocks, including the proposed One Vanderbilt. Under the proposal, developers of structures on these blocks could deposit money into an improvement fund for East Midtown and, in exchange, receive a FAR of up to 24. Some sites would be eligible for a FAR of up to 30. The zoning provision would permit One Vanderbilt to obtain the desired FAR of 30. Bloomberg withdrew his plans that November because residents, preservationists, and local politicians complained about the prospective influx of office workers to the area. After the rezoning proposal failed, SL Green's CEO Marc Holliday said he was unsure if he would proceed with the development of One Vanderbilt. Despite this, the design features of the planned skyscraper were retained.

=== Revival of plans ===
==== 2014 proposal ====
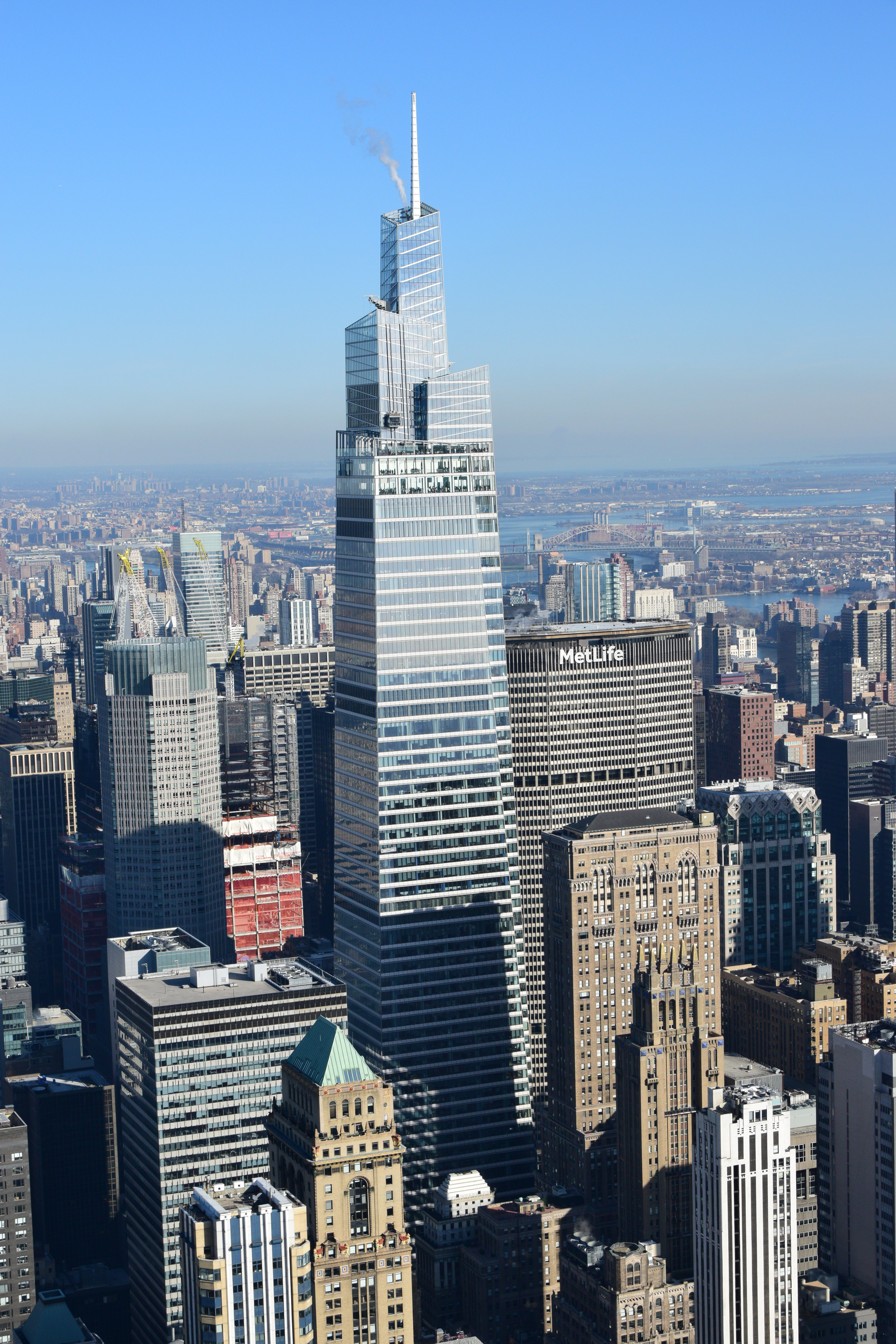
One Vanderbilt from the Empire State Building

When Bill de Blasio succeeded Bloomberg as mayor in 2014, he wished to implement Bloomberg's Midtown East rezoning proposal. That May, TD Bank announced its interest in expanding offices within New York City, focusing in particular on the delayed One Vanderbilt development, where it could be an anchor tenant. The following week, SL Green officially revived its plans for One Vanderbilt. De Blasio's administration proposed rezoning the area around Vanderbilt Avenue to allow One Vanderbilt to be constructed. This rezoning covered a smaller five-block region immediately west of Vanderbilt Avenue, rather than the entire neighborhood. Unlike Bloomberg's proposal, which would have converted all of Vanderbilt Avenue to a pedestrian plaza, de Blasio's proposal called for the conversion of a short section outside One Vanderbilt.

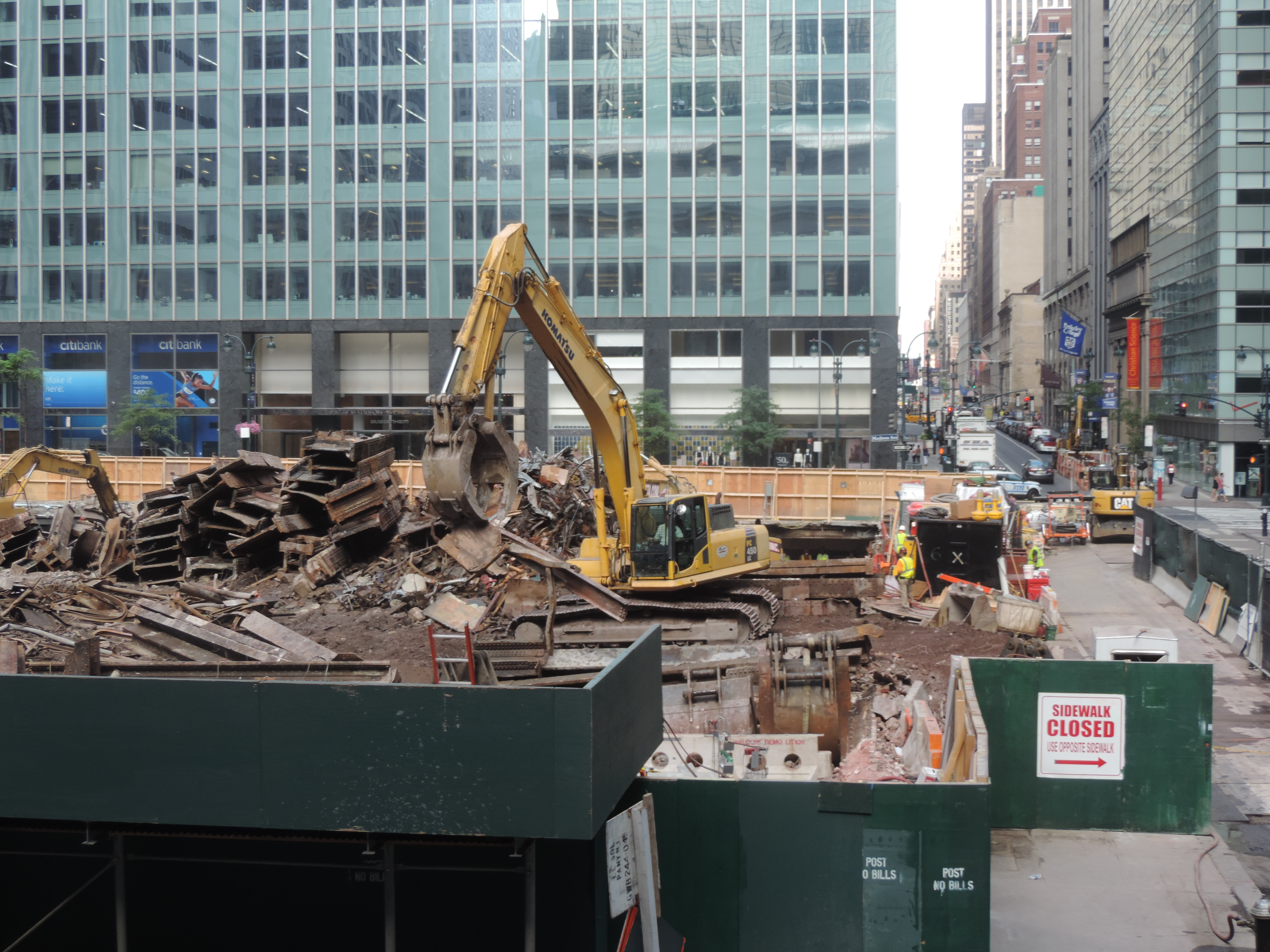
Demolition underway, August 2016

Since Grand Central Terminal was a New York City designated landmark, the New York City Landmarks Preservation Commission (LPC) had to endorse development around the terminal. SL Green thus applied to the LPC for a "certificate of appropriateness" regarding the transfer of air rights from the Bowery Savings Bank Building. At a hearing in July 2014, the LPC endorsed One Vanderbilt's construction, though the Historic Districts Council and the Society for the Architecture of the City both expressed strong opposition. In exchange for further increases to the FAR, and thus the building's height, SL Green proposed transit improvements around Grand Central in September 2014. The increased FAR would allow the building to have about twice the maximum floor area typically allowed for the site. At public hearings for the proposed transit improvements, neighborhood residents questioned the high price of the improvements, which was quoted at $210 million. Conversely, transit experts stated that the cost of the improvements was justified due to the amount of work that was necessary.

Shortly after One Vanderbilt's plans were revived, Andrew Penson—the founder of Midtown TDR Ventures, which owned the land under Grand Central Terminal—threatened to sue for $1 billion in a dispute concerning the air rights above the terminal's underground tracks. In its September 2014 proposal to the city, SL Green proposed to pay $400 per square foot for the air rights, then build a 1,500-foot (460 m), 67-story building, twice as big as the zoning rules permitted. Penson proposed paying SL Green $400 million for 1.3 million square feet (120,000 m^{2}) of air rights, and he also proposed assuming the $210 million cost of the transit improvements SL Green planned to make. Penson valued the air rights at up to $600 per square foot ($6,500/m^{2}), nearly 10 times the $61 per square foot ($660/m^{2}) he paid when he bought the station in 2006. SL Green rejected Penson's offer as a "publicity stunt".

==== Revision and rezoning approval ====
By October 2014, One Vanderbilt was projected to be 1,514 feet (461 m) high. The following month, TD Bank signed a lease at the building, officially becoming an anchor tenant. Disputes over the proposed transit improvements at One Vanderbilt continued. That December, an advisory task force composed of two local community boards indicated that it would oppose the improvements unless the building's energy efficiency was increased and one of the Grand Central entrances was relocated.

In January 2015, Manhattan Borough President Gale Brewer endorsed the project with several stipulations, including benches and restrooms in the proposed transit hall, as well as a requirement that SL Green maintain the plaza on Vanderbilt Avenue. Public hearings on the proposed rezoning of One Vanderbilt proceeded the next month. Constitutional lawyer Laurence Tribe testified against the proposal on behalf of Penson, under the argument that SL Green had taken Grand Central's air rights from the city rather than purchasing them from Penson. In March 2015, the DCP approved the Vanderbilt Avenue rezoning as well as SL Green's proposal for One Vanderbilt. The Vanderbilt Avenue rezoning received unanimous approval from the New York City Council in May 2015, following an endorsement by the council's zoning subcommittee.

=== Construction ===
Construction progress

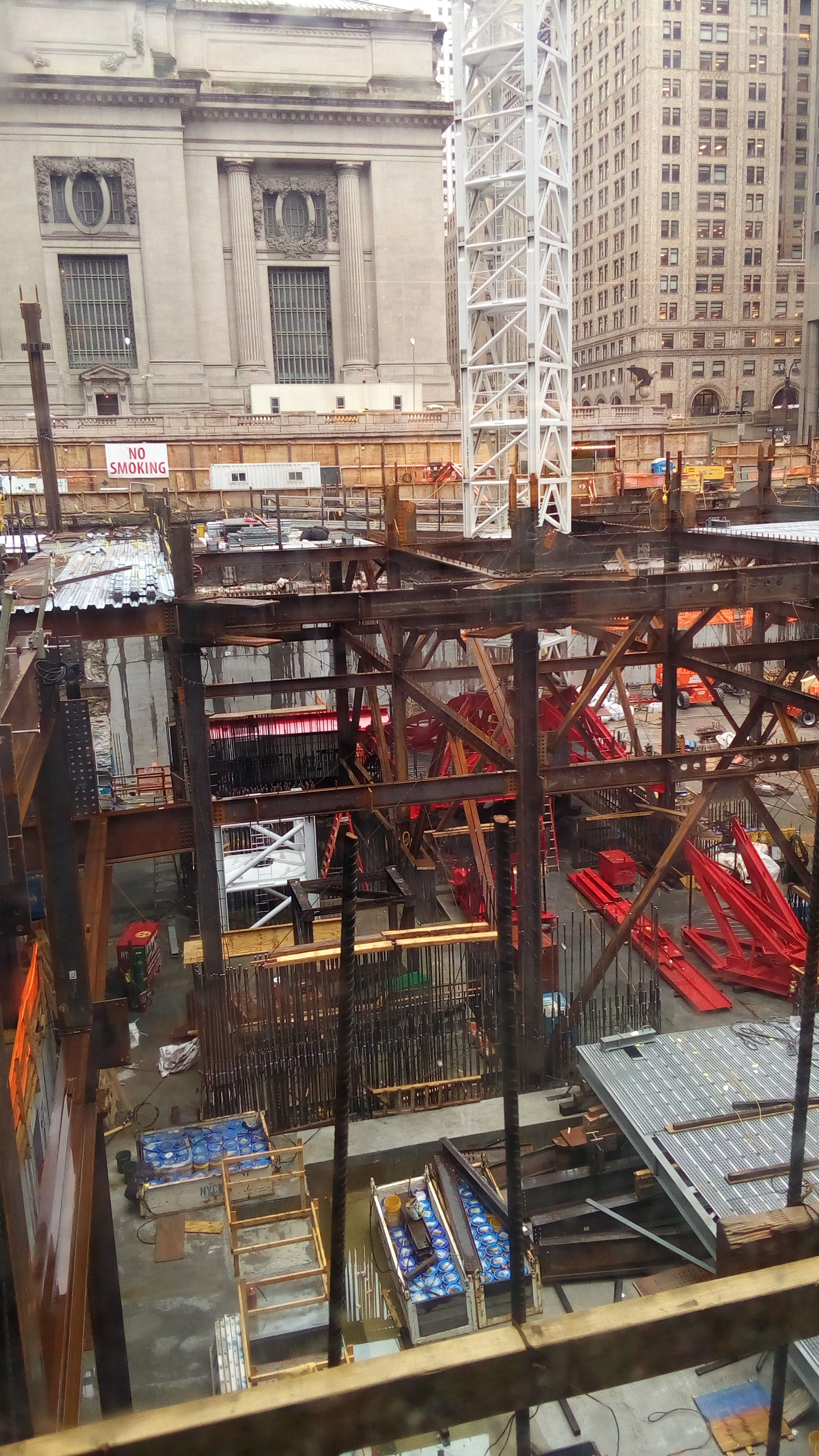
August 2017

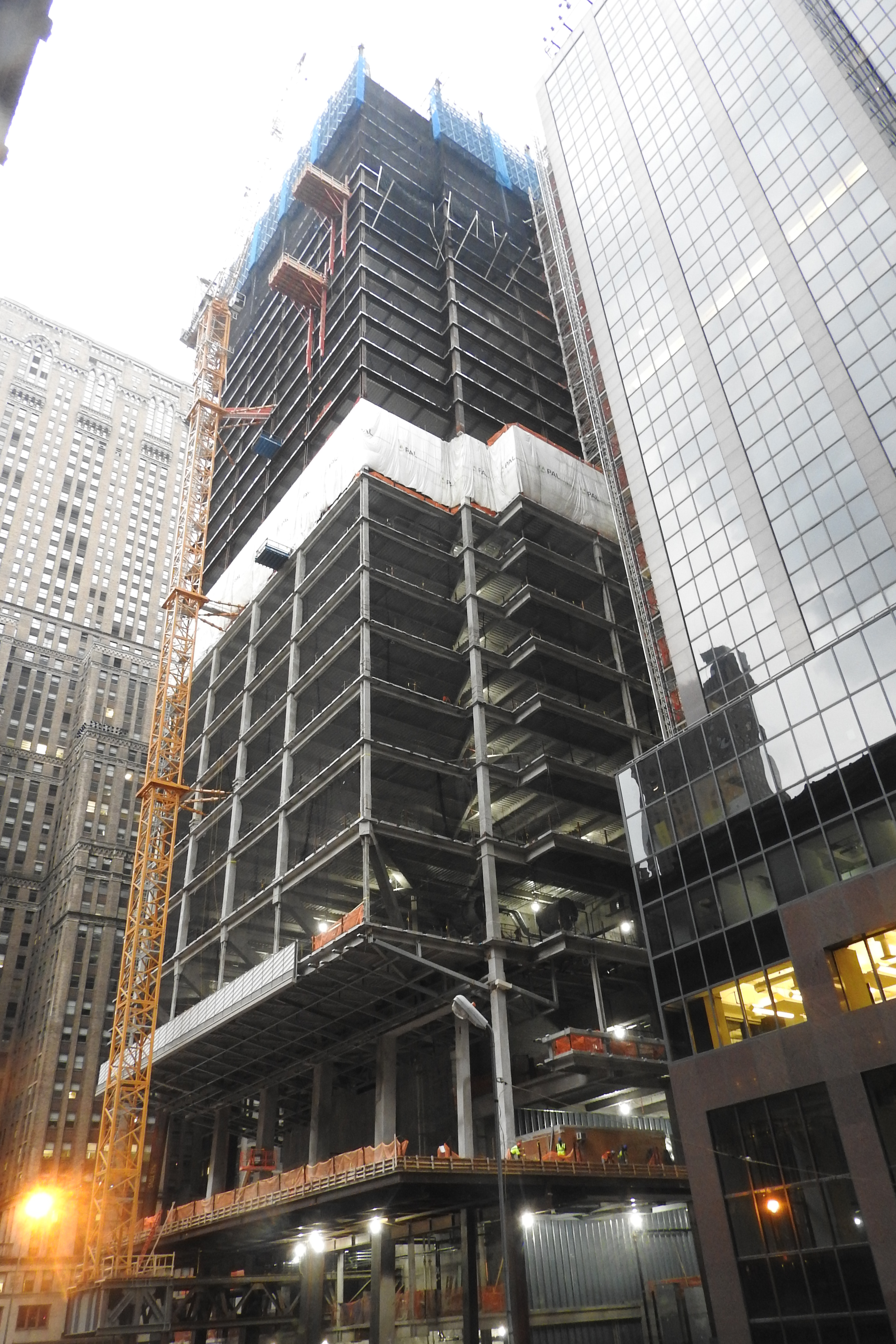
August 2018

October 2018

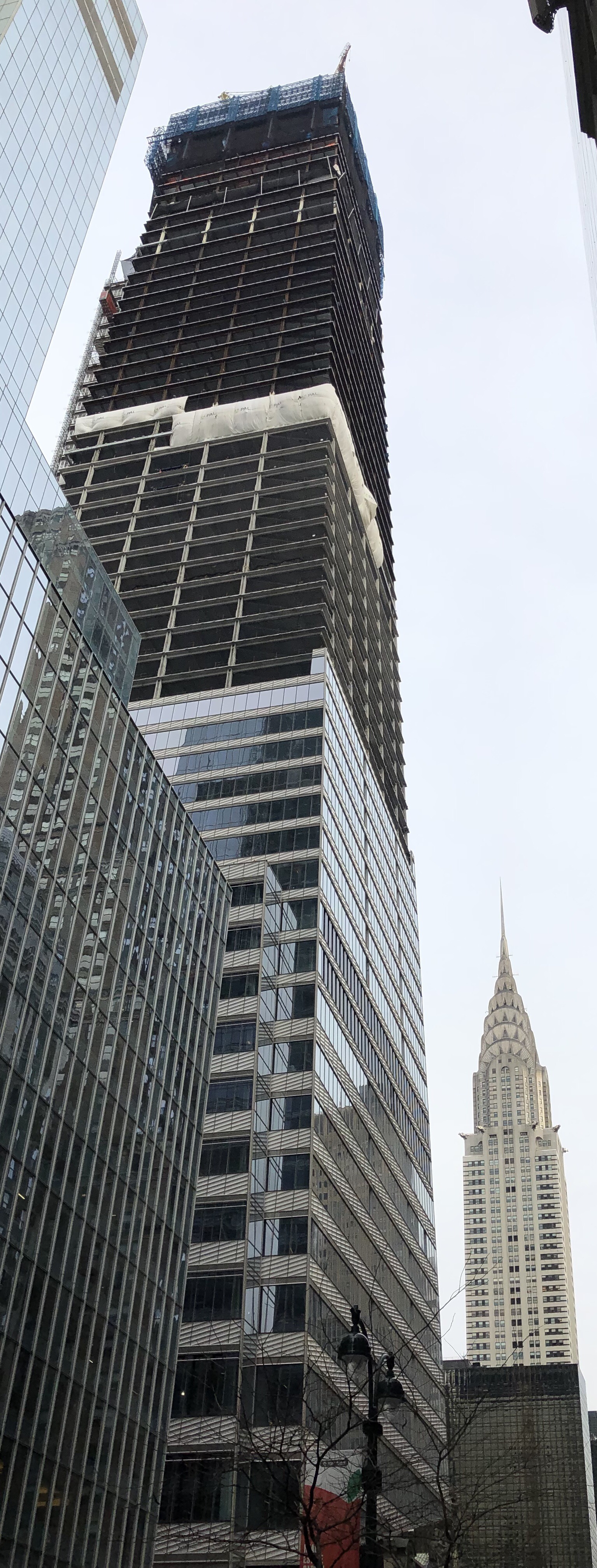
February 2019

Immediately after the project received city approval, SL Green announced it would start clearing the site. During demolition of one of the buildings that July, a chandelier and a banister fell on four construction workers who were taking down the chandelier, injuring them. By the following month, some excavations had begun. With excavation ongoing, in September 2015, SL Green filed construction plans for a 1,400-foot-tall (430 m) tower, slightly shorter than what had been announced the previous year. The same month, Penson sued the city and SL Green for $1.1 billion, claiming that the city government had given SL Green the air rights over Grand Central for free. Midtown TDR dropped the lawsuit in August 2016 in exchange for an undisclosed sum.

At a forum in June 2016, SL Green had indicated that the building could cost about $3.14 billion. That month, a consortium of banks including Wells Fargo, The Bank of New York Mellon, JPMorgan Chase, Toronto-Dominion Bank, Bank of China, and Landesbank Baden-Württemberg offered a $1.5 billion, five-year loan for the tower's construction. The loan was finalized that September. The following month, general contractor AECOM Tishman subcontracted the construction of One Vanderbilt to Navillus Tile for $135.9 million. Liberty Mutual was the guarantor for the contract. An official groundbreaking occurred on October 18, 2016. At the ceremony, de Blasio described One Vanderbilt as the "right kind" of development in East Midtown, while Brewer said the planned skyscraper had "set the bar very high" for other new developments nearby. No other tenants besides TD Bank had yet signed leases for space in One Vanderbilt. That December, plans for the building's observation deck were announced.

In January 2017, South Korea's National Pension Service and development firm Hines Interests Limited Partnership paid a combined $525 million for a 27.6% and 1.4% stake in the development, respectively. At the time, SL Green projected that One Vanderbilt would earn $198 million annually, including $42 million from the observation deck alone. Foundation laying started the next month. The work included one of the largest continuous concrete pours to ever take place in New York City. By that June, the skyscraper's first vertical beams had been constructed. One Vanderbilt's superstructure reached above ground level in October 2017. The following month, Navillus filed for bankruptcy, and Tishman moved to end its subcontract with Navillus, though work on the skyscraper continued. In January 2018, Tishman, SL Green, and Liberty Mutual agreed to let Navillus complete the subcontract for One Vanderbilt's construction.

One Vanderbilt's construction proceeded faster than originally scheduled and, by February 2018, the tower had been completed to the ninth floor. By June of the same year, the tower had reached the sixteenth floor. Facade installation began in August 2018, at which point the structure had passed the 30th floor, or more than half its eventual height. By November, the structure had reached the 56th floor, high enough to provide views above neighboring buildings. Around that time, SL Green refinanced the construction loan, increasing it to $1.75 billion and reducing the interest rate. The building topped out on September 17, 2019. The building cost $3.31 billion in total.

=== Completion and early years ===
At the end of 2019, SL Green announced that the building was expected to open the following August. Shortly afterward, the top part of the spire was temporarily removed so construction cranes could add cladding to the crown. The building's completion was delayed slightly in early 2020 due to the COVID-19 pandemic in New York City. By that June, the building was 67 percent leased in spite of the pandemic. Prior to the COVID-19 pandemic, One Vanderbilt's leasing agents had sought for the building to be 82 percent leased by the end of 2020; however, the agents revised their forecast to 72 percent. The New York City Department of Buildings issued a temporary certificate of occupancy for One Vanderbilt on September 11, 2020, but refused to grant a formal certificate of occupancy until the transit upgrades were done. One Vanderbilt was formally opened with a ceremony three days later, on September 14. At the time, tenant spaces were incomplete, and the first tenants could not move into the building until that November.

The Le Pavillon restaurant at the building's base opened in May 2021. The following month, a banking consortium led by Wells Fargo and Goldman Sachs refinanced One Vanderbilt for about $3 billion. The refinancing included a 10-year, fixed-rate loan using commercial mortgage-backed securities and was intended to pay off part of the $1.75 billion debt incurred during construction. By July 2021, SL Green was advertising the top two floors at rates of up to $322 per square foot ($3,470/m^{2}), the highest office rents in the city. Ticket sales for Summit One Vanderbilt launched in September 2021, a month before the planned October 21 opening, and a press preview was held on September 24. The building was 90 percent leased by October 2021; the Financial Times quoted Holliday as saying he wished the building "had 20 more floors because if [he] did we could lease them". Summit One Vanderbilt opened on October 21 of that year. By late 2022, ninety-nine percent of One Vanderbilt's office space had been leased.

One Vanderbilt's Centurion New York club opened in March 2023 on the 55th floor. On March 21, 2023, an elevator for Summit One Vanderbilt rapidly fell three stories and struck a buffer spring; no one was injured. The collision caused the building to shake and prompted some tenants to evacuate. By September 2024, the building's space was fully leased. In November 2024, the Mori Building Company bought an 11% ownership stake in One Vanderbilt; at the time, the building was valued at $4.7 billion. Mori bought another 5% ownership stake in the building in October 2025.

== Tenants ==
To attract tenants to One Vanderbilt, SL Green offered to pay off their old leases, such as that of The Carlyle Group, whose lease SL Green paid off for around $100 million. As of October 2021, the building is 90 percent leased. Tenants include:

- Lower level: Jōji restaurant
- Ground floor: Watches of Switzerland
- Lobby and anchor tenant: FL 14, 20, 21, 22, 23 TD Bank
- 2nd floor: Le Pavillon restaurant
- 10th–12th floors: TD Securities
- 15th floor: Kyndryl
- 15th–16th floors: Oak Hill Advisors
- 24th floor: Accordion Partners, InTandem Capital Partners, and Sagewind Capital LLC
- 26th floor: DZ Bank
- 27th–28th floors: SL Green
- 29th–31st floors: Greenberg Traurig (Note: When Greenberg Traurig's lease was announced in 2018, media reported that they took four contiguous floors but did not specify the floor numbers.)
- 33rd floor: Walker & Dunlop
- 34th–38th floors: The Carlyle Group
- 44th–47th, 67th floors: McDermott Will & Emery
- 48th floor: MFA Financial
- 51st floor: Mubadala
- 52nd floor: KPS Capital Partners
- 55th floor: American Express' Centurion New York club; previously reported as an undisclosed financial service firm
- 60th floor: UiPath, a software company for robotic process automation
- 62nd floor: FIS Global
- 73rd floor: GFL Environmental
- Four unidentified floors: Stone Ridge Asset Management

== Reception ==
Writing for The Real Deal magazine in December 2015, James Gardiner said the proposal "does not feel as striking or impressive as one could want", in that it failed to stand out in any way other than its height. Justin Davidson of New York magazine described One Vanderbilt as a rare "civic-minded Goliath" in that, while other skyscrapers are usually built in a design that maximizes profit, One Vanderbilt's base is designed for easier pedestrian and transit access in the nearby area. Davidson described One Vanderbilt as being "simultaneously bold and meek", saying the building was "chunky" like the buildings at Hudson Yards while also not obstructing the existing skyline too much. A writer for the Commercial Observer said in 2023 that "One Vanderbilt has quickly staked its claim as the prime office property in all of New York City" because of its location, design, and amenities.

== See also ==
- List of tallest buildings in New York City
- List of tallest freestanding structures in the world
- List of tallest freestanding steel structures
- List of tallest buildings
