= After Hours with Daniel =

- Genre: Reality television Cooking
- Starring: Daniel Boulud
- Country of origin: United States
- Original language: English
- No. of seasons: 3

Production
- Production company: Automatic Productions

Original release
- Network: Mojo HD; Ovation
- Release: 2006 – 2008

After Hours with Daniel (also known as After Hours with Daniel Boulud) is an American reality cooking television series hosted by chef Daniel Boulud.

== Overview ==
A behind-closed-doors look at the late-night dinners for and by chefs. Each season revolved around where chefs go to unwind after service and brought to light foods they enjoy and cook for each other. Season one was shot in New York City restaurants. Season two was filmed on the West Coast, Los Angeles restaurants. The third and final season featured eateries in the Miami and New Orleans culinary world.
