= Helms Bakery =

Historic California bread company (1931–1961)

Coordinates: 34.029945°N 118.385373°W

- Helms Olympic Bread building, Culver City, California, 1977
- Type: Private company
- Industry: Food (bakery)
- Founded: March 2, 1931; 95 years ago
- Defunct: 1969
- Headquarters: Los Angeles/Culver City, California, U.S.
- Products: Bread, cake
- Owner: Paul Helms
- Website: helmsbakerydistrict.com

Helms Bakery was an industrial bakery on the border of Los Angeles and Culver City, in Southern California, that operated from 1931 to 1969. Currently the buildings have been adapted for use as retail shops, restaurants, and furniture showrooms; the complex is part of what is now called the Helms Design District.

== History ==
"Olympic Bread" logo on building photographed by John Margolies in 1977

Helms Bakery in 1977

In 1926, Paul Helms of New York took early retirement for health reasons and moved his family to Southern California. Helms started construction on a building between Washington and Venice Boulevards in 1930 and, on March 2, 1931, the Helms Bakery opened with 32 employees and 11 delivery coaches. Helms was reported to have wanted his delivery vehicles to be known as coaches, noting that garbage is delivered in trucks.

The Helms motto was "Daily at Your Door" and every weekday morning, from both the Culver City facility and a second Helms Bakery site in Montebello, dozens of Helms coaches, painted in a two-tone scheme, would leave the bakery for various parts of the Los Angeles Basin to San Gabriel Valley, when the network of freeways had not yet been built. Each coach, piloted by a "Helmsman", would travel through assigned neighborhoods. The driver periodically pulled (twice) on a large handle that sounded a whistle or stopping at a house where a Helms sign, a blue placard with an "H" on it, was displayed in their windows.

=== 1932 Olympics ===
Helms Bakery become the "official baker" of the 1932 Summer Olympics when Paul Helms won a contract to supply bread for the 1932 games in Los Angeles. His slogan was "Olympic Games Bakers - Choice of Olympic Champions." Four years later, in time for the 1936 Summer Olympics, Germany asked Helms for his bread recipes. The U.S. teams at London and Helsinki requested his bread be served. Early Helms vehicles sported the Olympic symbol, and it also appeared on and was mentioned in, the Helms logo on the bread wrappers, the company logo, and sign.

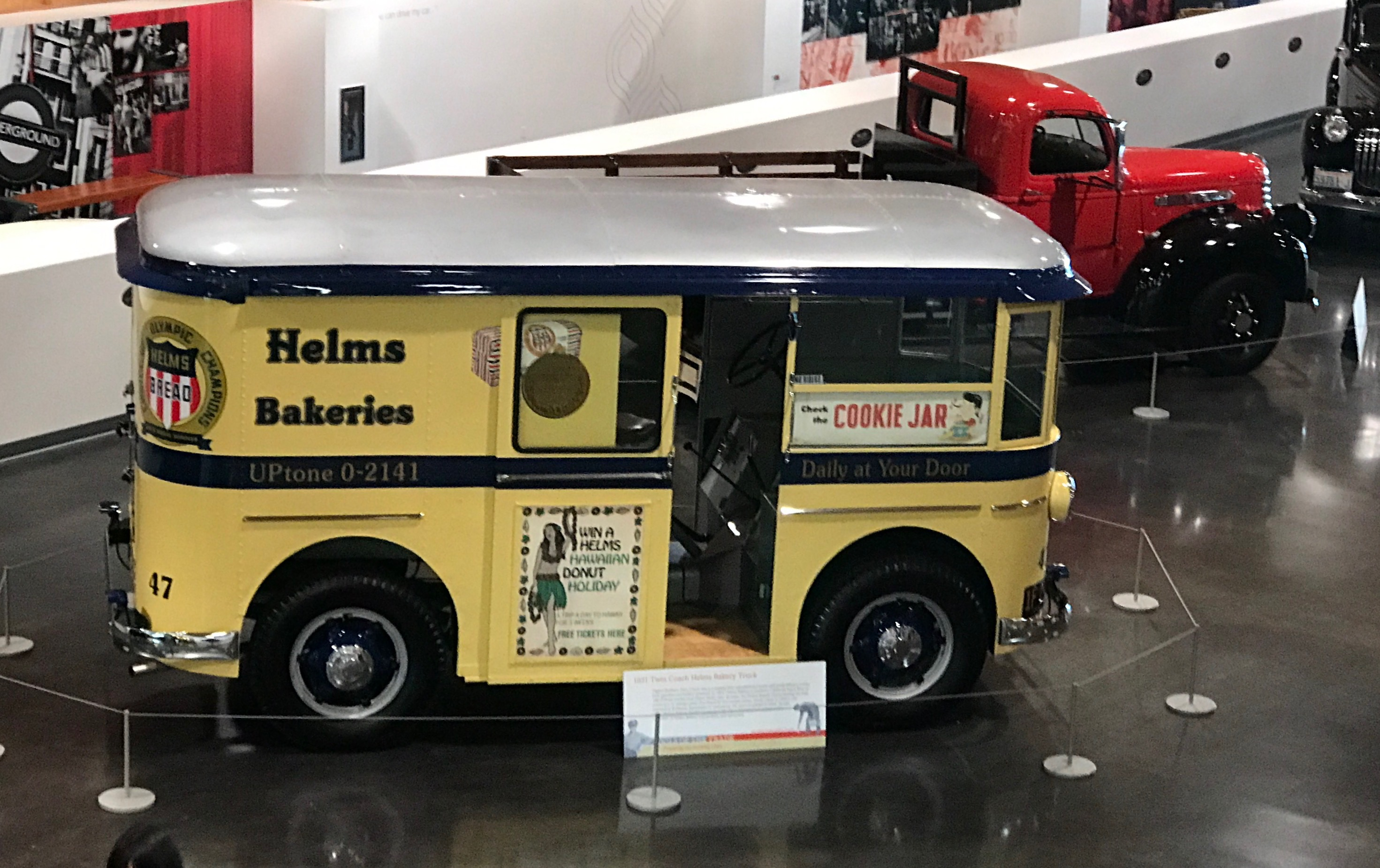
Helms delivery truck, c. 1950, located at the LeMay Car museum in Tacoma, Washington

Paul Helms died on January 5, 1957, at age 67, but the business continued to operate, run by family members. Its delivery network gradually grew to include Fresno to the north; San Bernardino to the east, and south to Orange County and San Diego. The San Bernardino facility was located on the northeast corner of Mt. Vernon Avenue and Birch Street.

=== Apollo 11 ===
In the company's final year of operation, a marketing campaign netted Helms a contract to furnish "the first bread on the moon," via the Apollo 11 space mission.

=== Closure ===
Citing changing consumer shopping habits, and the threat unionization by drivers, the Helms company ceased operations in 1969. Paul Helms Jr stated, “The irreversible reality is that this form of merchandising is no longer needed by the consumer.” The Marks family purchased Helms Bakery in the early 1970s and initiated adaptive reuse of a historic structure.

== Delivery Vehicles ==
Helms was well known throughout Los Angeles for distinctive delivery vehicles, painted in pale yellow and varying other colors. Helms used several different vehicles over the years, including trucks from DIVCO and Twin Coach. Helms eventually replaced their fleet with General Motors Panel Vans.

=== Vehicles on Display ===
Lyon Air Museum in Santa Ana CA - 1940's Faegol / Twin Coach

Lions Automobilia Museum in Rancho Dominguez CA - 1962 Chevrolet

LeMay Car Museum Tacoma WA - 1950's Twin Coach (Possibly no longer on display)

Petersen Automotive Museum, Los Angeles CA (Possibly no longer on display)

== Today ==
The former bakery location in Culver City is now home to the Helms Design District. The district includes restaurants, a bakery marketplace and design and home furnishing stores. In 2003, the iconic Helms Olympic Bakery sign was restored and relit at the cost of $60,000.

In November 2024, a modern interpretation of Helms Bakery opened in the district, offering bakery items that evoke the Helms era. The new Helms Bakery ceased operations in December 2025.

There is an active Facebook group, entitled "Helms Bakery Truck".

The Los Angeles Museum of Natural History houses a collection of ephemera relating to the Helms, including placards and wrappers.

== In popular culture ==
Artist Art Mortimer created a three dimensional mural at the Culver City location entitled "Helms Coach Gone A Rye", depicting the rear portion of a Helms Bakery coach and a mural of a Los Angeles street.

In the 1954 episode of Dragnet, "The Big Frame", at the 13:05 minute mark the distinctive Helms Bakery whistle can be heard in the background. A character then references needing to get bread and other items from "the bakery wagon".

In an apparent tribute to the Helms Bakery, a churro cart ("Willie's Churros") in Disney California Adventure is styled and painted to resemble a Helms delivery coach.

== See also ==
- Helms Athletic Foundation
