= Daniel Boulud =

French chef and restaurateur (born 1955)

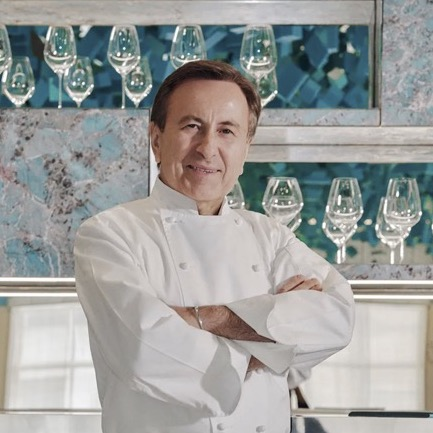
- Boulud in 2023
- Born: 25 March 1955 (age 71); Saint-Pierre-de-Chandieu, France
- Culinary career
- Cooking style: French cuisine
- Current restaurants
- Daniel, Le Pavillon, Le Gratin, Bar Boulud, Boulud Sud, Épicerie Boulud, Joji and Joji Box (New York, NY); Café Boulud Palm Beach, Boulud Sud Miami (Florida); Maison Boulud (Montréal); Café Boulud (Toronto); Café Boulud (the Bahamas); Brassiere Boulud (Dubai); Café Boulud (New York, NY); Maison Boulud (Singapore)
- Television shows
- After Hours with Daniel; Great Chefs; Top Chef Canada; The Bear
- Website: www.danielboulud.com

Daniel Boulud (born 25 March 1955) is a French chef and restaurateur with restaurants in New York City, Palm Beach, Miami, Toronto, Montréal, Singapore, the Bahamas, and Dubai. He is best known for his eponymous restaurant Daniel, opened in New York City in 1993, which currently holds one Michelin star.

Boulud was raised on a farm near Lyon and trained by several French chefs. Boulud built a reputation in New York, initially as a chef and more recently as a restaurateur. His management company, The Dinex Group, currently includes fifteen restaurants, three locations of a gourmet cafe (Epicerie Boulud) and Feast & Fêtes Catering. His restaurants include Daniel, Le Pavillon, Le Gratin, Café Boulud, Maison Boulud, Joji, and Joji Box, db bistro, Bar Boulud, and Boulud Sud.

== Culinary background ==
At fifteen, Boulud earned his first professional recognition as a finalist in France's competition for Best Culinary Apprentice. Boulud worked in France with Roger Vergé, Georges Blanc and Michel Guérard and later in Copenhagen before becoming the private chef to the European Commission in Washington, D.C.

After moving to New York City, Boulud opened the Polo Lounge at The Westbury Hotel, followed by Le Régence at the Hotel Plaza Athénée. From 1986 to 1992, he was the critically acclaimed executive chef at Le Cirque.

== Restaurants ==
Boulud opened Daniel in Manhattan's Upper East Side in 1993 before relocating the restaurant to a Venetian renaissance-inspired setting at Park Avenue and 65th Street in 1998. The original Daniel was re-launched as Café Boulud. He opened a more casual restaurant, db Bistro Moderne, in Manhattan's theater district in 2001. The $29 db Bistro burger, stuffed with braised short ribs, preserved black truffles, and foie gras, was seen as an example of American excess. According to John T. Edge, other chefs "follow[ed] in Boulud's wake" to add burgers to the menus of upscale restaurants. After other chefs offered even more expensive burgers, Boloud started adding fresh shaved truffles to his burger and selling it for $59, and by 2004 was offering a $99 version.

In 2003 he opened a second Café Boulud in Palm Beach, Florida. Bar Boulud, a French bistro opposite New York City's Lincoln Center, was opened in January 2008.

In 2009, Boulud opened DBGB Kitchen & Bar, a Pan-European brasserie, in New York City. Bar Boulud London opened on May 29, 2010, inside the Mandarin Oriental Hotel on Knightsbridge, becoming the first Boulud's restaurant in Europe.

2011 saw many new Boulud openings, including db Bistro & Oyster Bar at Marina Bay Sands in Singapore, a Maison Boulud in Ritz-Carlton Montreal, as well as Boulud Sud next to Bar Boulud, and Épicerie Boulud, a market/deli. In the following year, d|bar opened in the Four Seasons Hotel Toronto, The third location of Epicerie Boulud opened in the Oculus World Trade Center in November 2016.

In April 2014, Boulud opened DB Brasserie at The Palazzo. It would close in January 2017 driven by differences in the imagined concept by Boulud versus what the hotel/casino desired.

Around 2018, Boulud collaborated with a group of MIT entrepreneurs to create Spyce Kitchen, a robotic restaurant in Boston. He was responsible for the menu while the founders developed the technology. Following over a billion dollar valuation, the restaurant announced its acquisition by Sweetgreen at the end of 2021.

Boulud opened Le Pavillon, a Michelin starred restaurant in the One Vanderbilt skyscraper in Midtown Manhattan, in May 2021.

In March 2023, he became head of dining and menu strategy for Centurion New York, a members-only restaurant created by American Express. Later that spring, he opened another New York City restaurant, Blue Box Café, located in Tiffany & Co.

In May 2022, Boulud opened Le Gratin, located in New York's Financial District, paying culinary homage to his French roots. In September of the same year, Boulud opened Jōji, an Omakase experience also located in One Vanderbilt, beneath Le Pavillon. Café Boulud NY is also set to re-open in 2023, following a closure in 2021 during the pandemic.

In January 2024, db Bistro & Oyster Bar in Singapore was closed and replaced with a Maison Boulud restaurant.

In November 2024, Boulud opened La Tête d'Or, his first steakhouse, in the Flatiron District of Manhattan.

== Smoked salmon ==
Since 2014, Boulud has produced a signature line of prepackaged smoked salmon that was originally exclusively sold at Whole Foods locations, but is now sold at various high-end food markets.

== Awards ==
Daniel has been rated one of the top ten restaurants in the world by the International Herald Tribune, received Gourmet's Top Table Award, a four-star rating from The New York Times, Wine Spectator's Grand Award, and New York City's top ratings for cuisine, service, and decor in the Zagat Survey. In 2010, Daniel was the recipient of the James Beard Award for Outstanding Restaurant. In January 2013, Daniel NYC was inducted into Culinary Hall of Fame. Daniel was awarded 2 Michelin stars in the 2015 edition. The restaurant also won the 2023 Innovation Award from La Liste, as one of the top 1,000 restaurants in the world.

Boulud himself earned the inaugural Best New Chefs award in 1988. Since then, he has been named Chef of the Year by Bon Appétit, and received the James Beard Award for Best Chef of New York City in 1992 while Executive Chef at Le Cirque. The James Beard Foundation also recognized him as "Outstanding Chef of the Year" in 1994 and "Outstanding Restaurateur" in 2006 for restaurant Daniel. In April 2007, he received the Culinary Humanitarian Award at the United Nations from the Adopt-a-Mine Field Foundation. The President of France made Boulud a Chevalier de la Légion d'honneur in March 2006 in recognition of his contribution to the advancement of French culture. In 2015, Boulud was the recipient of the International Outstanding Achievement Award at the 2015 The Catey Awards, as well as winner of the Lifetime Achievement award by The World's 50 Best Restaurants. In 2021, he was voted best restaurateur in the world by Les Grandes Tables du Monde for his flagship restaurant Daniel.

== Television ==
Boulud previously hosted After Hours with Daniel a behind-closed-doors look at the late-night dinners by chefs and for chefs.

Boulud has also been a featured chef on Great Chefs television, and appeared in the second-season finale of the Canadian television program Anna & Kristina's Grocery Bag, where his cookbook Chef Daniel Boulud: Cooking in New York City was being tested. Boulud appeared as the guest judge along with chefs from his restaurants located in Vancouver: Stephane Istel, executive chef at DB Bistro Moderne, and Dale MacKay, executive chef at Lumière. Boulud's cookbook received the "A & K Stamp of Approval" at the end of the episode.

Boulud appeared as a guest judge in Seasons 1 and 3 of Top Chef Canada.

Boulud appeared as himself in the television drama series Billions, episode "Flaw in the Death Star," season 3 and the episode “Napoleon’s Hat” in season 6. He also appeared as himself in the third-season premiere of the FX on Hulu comedy-drama series The Bear (2024).

== Community involvement ==
Since 2013, Boulud has been co-president of Citymeals-on-Wheels, a non-profit organization which provides home-delivered meals to homebound elderly in New York City, and a board member since 2000. Each spring since 1998, Boulud has hosted Sunday Supper gala, an annual gourmet event that has raised over $12 million for the organization since its inception.

The Daniel Boulud Scholarship Endowment Fund was established by the chef's business partner, Joel Smilow, in 2005. The fund provides education enabling promising young American cooks to pursue professional culinary studies in France.

In 2008, Paul Bocuse asked Boulud to establish a structure for the selection of the Bocuse d'Or Team USA, who, along with Thomas Keller and Jérôme Bocuse form the Board of Directors of the Bocuse d'Or USA Foundation. The first Bocuse d'Or USA competition was held in September 2008.

== Legal issues ==
According to a 2007 article in the Dining Section of The New York Times, Boulud was sued by current and former workers for discriminatory labor practices at his namesake restaurant in Manhattan. The federal Equal Employment Opportunity Commission filed suit, and there was an investigation by the Civil Rights Bureau of the New York state Attorney General's office. Boulud settled with the workers, seven current and former employees of Latin American and Bangladeshi descent, for $80,000 and agreed to set up standards and procedures for promotions to be overseen by the EEOC and the state attorney general's office.

== Books ==
- Cooking with Daniel Boulud (1993)
- Daniel Boulud's Café Boulud Cookbook (1999)
- In 2001, Boulud allowed author Leslie Brenner near unlimited access to Daniel the result was the 2002 book The Fourth Star: Dispatches from Inside Daniel Boulud's Celebrated New York Restaurant which gives some insight into the workings of the chef and how he operates.
- Daniel Boulud Cooking in New York City (2002)
- Daniel's Dish, Entertaining at Home with a Four Star Chef (2003)
- Letters to a Young Chef (2003)
- Braise: A Journey Through International Cuisine (2006)
- Daniel – My French Cuisine by Daniel Boulud (Author), Sylvie Bigar (Author), Thomas Schauer (Photographer), Bill Buford (Contributor) (2013)
