= Gastropub =

Pub that serves high-quality food

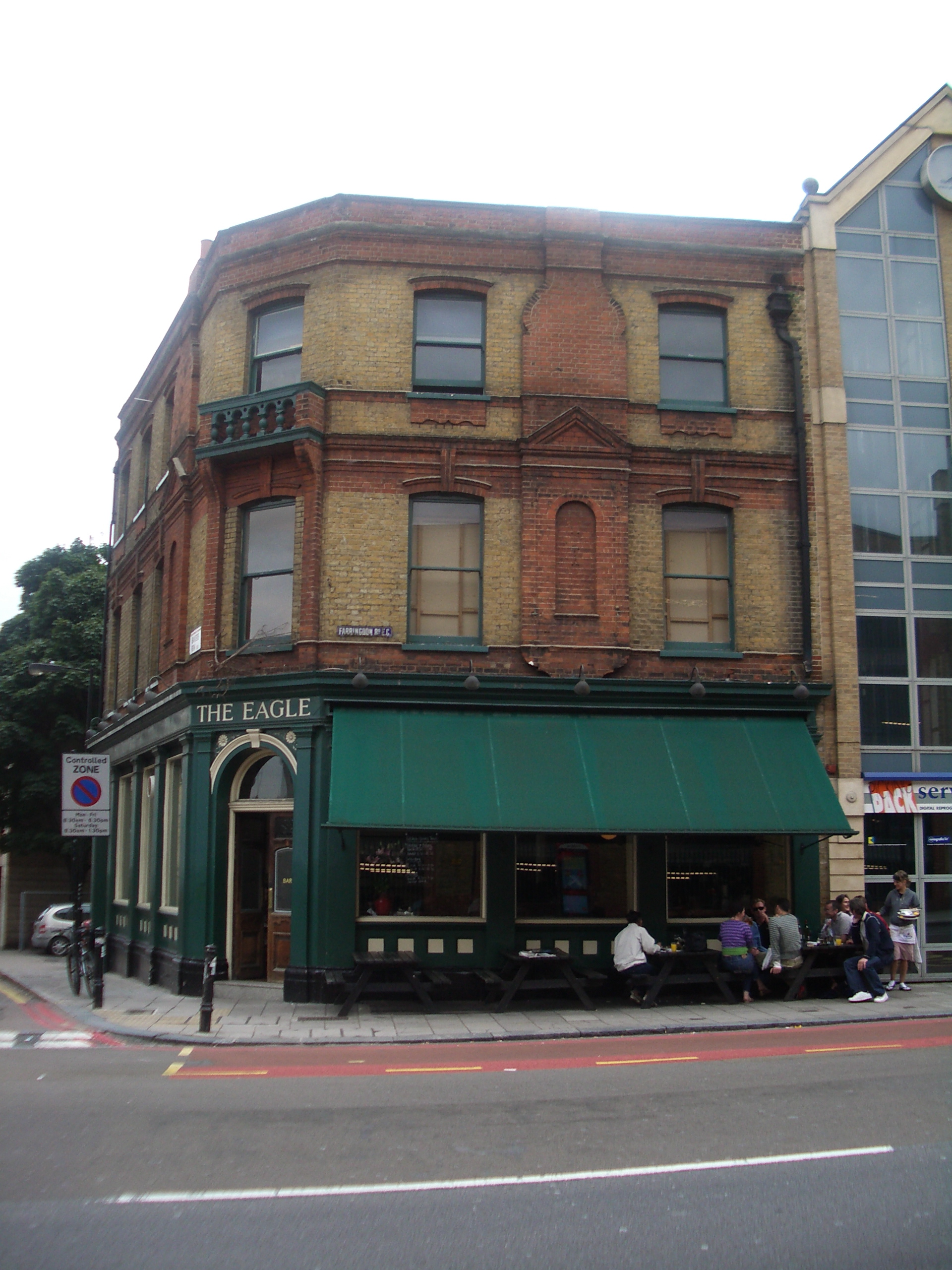
The Eagle in Clerkenwell, London; the first pub to which the term gastropub was applied.

A gastropub or gastro pub is a pub that serves food of high quality, with a nearly equal emphasis on eating and drinking. The term was coined in the 1990s in the United Kingdom.

== History ==
The term gastropub (derived from gastronomy) was coined in 1991, when David Eyre and Mike Belben took over The Eagle pub in Clerkenwell, London. Traditionally, British pubs were drinking establishments and little emphasis was placed on the serving of food.

The growth of gastropubs influenced change in British dining and pub culture, and has sometimes attracted criticism for potentially removing the character of traditional pubs. "Pub grub" expanded to include British food items such as steak and ale pie, shepherd's pie, fish and chips, bangers and mash, Sunday roast, ploughman's lunch, and pasties. In addition, dishes such as hamburgers, chips, lasagne and chili con carne are now often served.

In August 2012, gastropub was added to Merriam Webster's Collegiate Dictionary.

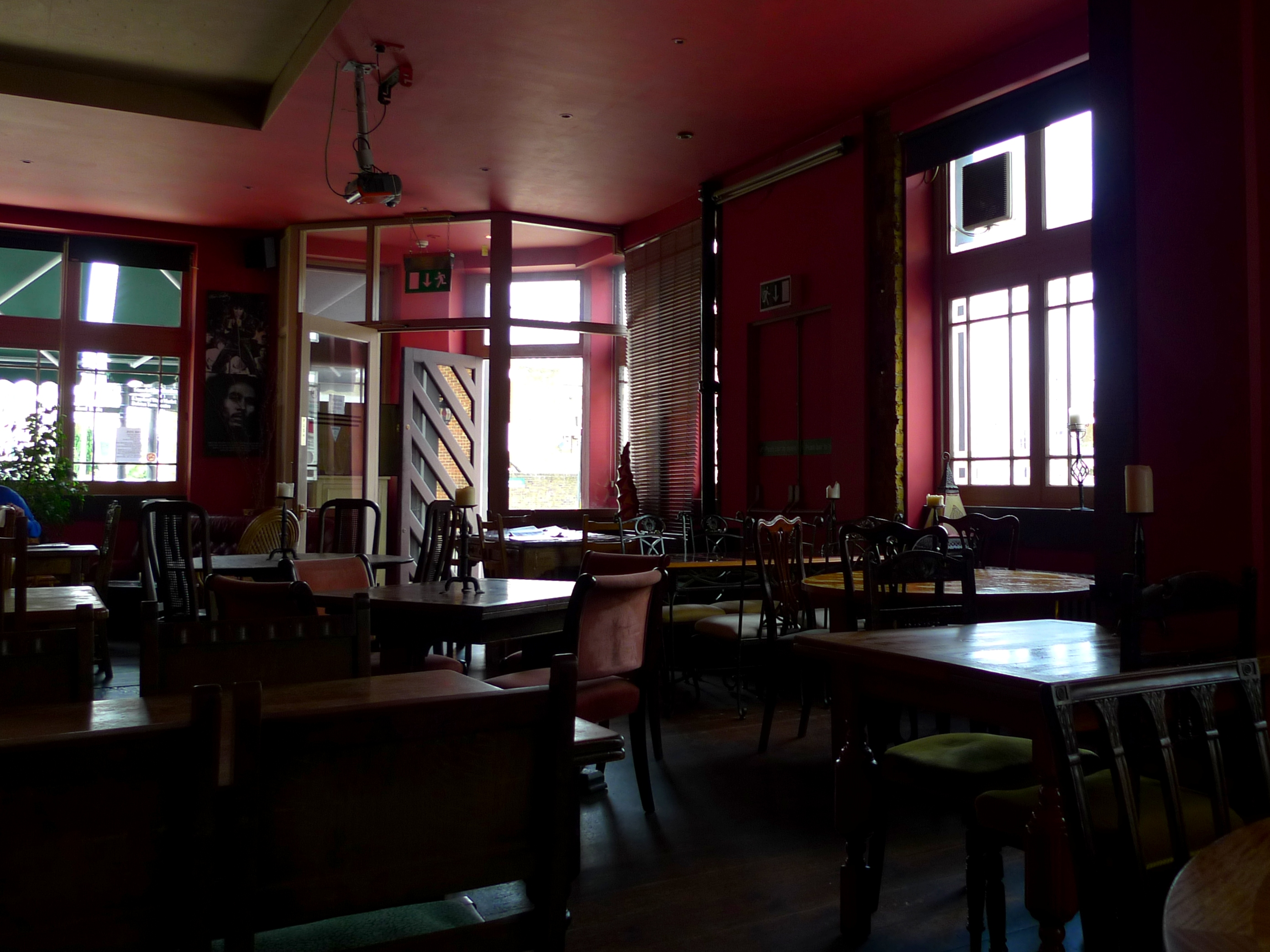
The Fox in Dalston, London

In 1984, Spinnakers Brew Pub opened in Victoria, British Columbia, Canada. The first ever custom-built brewpub in Canada, it heralded a new wave of brewpubs and craft breweries in British Columbia that followed a major deregulation of the brewing industry in that province. Spinnakers served inventive cuisine, and Joseph Blake of Eat magazine claims it as the world's oldest gastropub. Difford's Guide credited David Eyre and Mike Belben with introducing the first gastropub to the U.K., when they took over the Eagle in Clerkenwell in 1991 and upgraded the standard food options to "restaurant quality".

A gastropub in Los Angeles, California

Gastropubs became popular in the U.K. and U.S. in the 1990s and early 2000s.

== See also ==
- Brasserie
- List of public house topics
