= List of new media art festivals =

The following is a list of festivals dedicated to new media art.

== International and online festivals ==
- The ISEA International Symposium on Electronic Art is an annual event consisting of a symposium on issues related to electronic art and an exhibition in a festival format. Each year, the symposium is hosted by a different organization and country. The most recent festivals were:
  - ISEA2020 in Montreal, Canada
  - ISEA2019 in Gwangju, Republic of Korea
  - ISEA2018 in Durban, South Africa
  - ISEA2017 in Manizales, Colombia
  - ISEA2016 in Hong Kong,
  - ISEA2015 in Vancouver,
  - ISEA2014 in Dubai,
  - ISEA2013 in Sydney.
- MUTEK was founded in 2000 in Montreal, and ever since its main mission has been the organization of the MUTEK festival; which takes place every year at Mexico, Barcelona, Buenos Aires, Dubai, San Francisco and Tokyo. The festival gives an opportunity for local and international audience to see the latest digital creations, as well as works by emerging and established artists.

== Africa ==
Egypt

- Cairotronica Festival is a biannual electronic and media art festival in Cairo, but serves the Middle East and North African region.

Ethiopia

- ADDIS VIDEO ART FESTIVAL is an annual video art festival in Addis Ababa.

South Africa

- FAK'UGESI AFRICAN DIGITAL INNOVATION FESTIVAL is an annual media art festival in Johannesburg, but serves an Africa wide sector.

== Asia ==
China (mainland)

- Beijing 798 Art Festival brings together contemporary art, architecture, and culture with a historically interesting location and an urban lifestyle. It has evolved into a cultural concept, of interest to experts and normal folk alike, influential on its concepts of both urban culture and living space.

Discontinued:

- China International Gallery Exposition was an annual art exhibition that showcased modern art and design.

Hong Kong

- Clockenflap is an annual multimedia arts festival in Hong Kong.
- Microwave International New Media Arts Festival is an annual international media art festival.

Israel

- Print Screen Festival is an annual film and new media art festival initiated in 2010 and taking place in the Holon Cinematheque.

Indonesia

- Media Art Globale MAG is an art, technology and science themed festival showcasing cutting edge works held every two years. The festival focused on showcasing cutting-edge media artworks. We sourced exhibitors and participants from within the media art industry whose works are interesting in reality and not limited to concepts on paper. Organised by Connected Art Platform (CAP). The use of science and technology as a tool to create art. Collaborative work on sustainability projects. Interactive participation that stimulates enthusiasm and lead to knowledge exchange. International and Indonesian Media Artists, Scientists, Technologist and Educators. MAG19 theme: Transhuman Code, MAG20 theme: Quantum Land. MAG also one of host among 120 location in the worlds when Ars Electronica have their 41st anniversary in 2020.

@mediaartglobale

Japan

- Japan Media Arts Festival is an annual festival held by Japan's Agency for Cultural Affairs since 1997.

== Europe ==
Austria

- Ars Electronica is the largest international New Media festival which is held in Linz annually. The focus is always on current developments and possible future scenarios and the question of how they will change our lives. Ars Electronica is a worldwide unique platform for art, technology and society.
- Wiener FestWochen is positioned as a multidisciplinary art festival in the city of Vienna. Among Vienna's varied and tightly packed cultural offerings, the point is to present and allow things not yet seen and not yet heard and to work as a content engine linking genres, thoughts, and ideas.
- paraflows is a festival for digital art and culture in Vienna, Austria, founded in 2006. Its programme has included exhibitions, symposia, film screenings and concerts addressing media art, net culture and digital society.

Belgium

- Kikk Festival is an international festival of digital and creative cultures. Its interest lies in the artistic and economic implications of new technologies. The event gathers designers, scientists, makers, entrepreneurs, artists, architects, developers or musicians.

Bulgaria

- DA Fest is an international festival that introduces the Bulgarian audience to new artistic practices and significant achievements in the field of digital arts. The festival is organized by the DA LAB Foundation in cooperation with the National Academy of Arts in Sofia.
- Computer Space forum is a non-commercial international computer art forum. With twenty nine editions in a row behind its back and more than 20,000 participants (firms, studios or individual persons) from different countries from all over the world, today "Computer Space" is one of the biggest and most significant events for computer arts in south-east Europe which seeks to show the modern trends in the field of computer arts.

Finland

- Alternative Party promotes experimentation and psychological change through digital arts, utilizing the demoscene mindset of breaking boundaries, mixing machinery of different eras and capabilities.

Discontinued:

- Avanto was an experimental music and moving images festival.

France

- Outsider Art Fair was established in 1993 and now is the premier fair dedicated to Self-Taught Art, Art Brut and Outsider Art and takes place annually in New York and Paris.

Germany

- European Media Arts Festival (EMAF) is an international platform and competition for media art, experimental film, and digital culture, held annually in Osnabrück, Germany. The festival showcases contemporary trends in media art and offers a forum for both emerging and established artists working with film, video, installation, performance, and digital media. EMAF serves as a meeting point for artists, curators, and scholars, and features screenings, exhibitions, workshops, and lectures across various venues in the city.
- Cynetart is an International competition created by Trans-Media-Akademie Hellerau (TMA) and their partners. This festival is targeted for artists and artist collectives, researchers and scientists, who deal with new technologies in media in their artistic practice. It includes formats such as installation, objects, performance, net art and VR-works.
- Transmediale is a yearly festival for art and digital culture in Berlin. It facilitates critical reflection on and interventions into processes of cultural transformation from a post-digital perspective. Since 2011, transmediale's all-year activities include cooperation projects, networking activities, the Vilém Flusser Residency for Artistic Research, and special events.
- Videoart at Midnight is an international forum fostering contemporary art, in particular film, new media art and video art. In a monthly program international artists are invited to show their work in the big cinema hall of the Kino Babylon in the Mitte neighborhood of Berlin.
- ZKM, Center for Art and Media Karlsruhe, probes new media in theory and practice, tests their potential with in-house developments, presents possible uses in exemplary form and promotes debate on the form our information society is taking. Production and research, exhibitions and events, coordination and documentation.

Greece

- Athens Digital Arts Festival is an international festival, based in Athens, which celebrates digital culture through an annual gathering bringing together a global community of artists and audiences.

Italy

- MA/IN festival is an international festival, based in south Italy. It is focused on electroacoustic music culture and new trends in digital art.

The Netherlands

- Manifestations Festival is about Art, Tech & Fun and deals with a healthy development of technology, especially in the tech area of the Netherlands: Eindhoven. The festival takes place during Dutch Design Week and has 35,000 visitors. A parallel version takes place in several virtual worlds, like Sansar, Second Life, Mozilla Hubs, etc.
- IMPAKT Festival presents critical and creative views on contemporary media culture and on innovative audio-visual arts in an interdisciplinary context. It examines issues around society, digital culture, and media from various angles and within a range of disciplines in the arts, academia, and technology. Its main project is the annual IMPAKT Festival, a five-day multimedia event that includes exhibitions, film screenings, lectures, panels, performances, presentations, and artist talks at locations in Utrecht.
- Regenerative Feedback is an annual music, new media, sound art and philosophy festival. The idea behind this event is to present experimental performances; new media art, and to explore these through workshops, accessible lectures and conversations between experts and audiences.
- Sonic Acts aims to explore the genesis of our current crisis – and what happens in the hereafter – by reflecting on the issues we are forced to confront on a daily basis: the inequalities caused by colonization and geo-strategic maneuvering, the challenges brought forth by immigration and the climate crisis, the ever-present exploitation and precocity of the workforce, and the way technological advancements disrupt and not emancipate – that is, the gooey mesh of global capitalism.
- STEIM is a center for research and development of new musical instruments in the electronic performing arts, located in Amsterdam, Netherlands. Electronic music in STEIM's context is always strongly related to the physical and direct actions of a musician. In this tradition, STEIM supports artists in residence such as composers and performers, but also multimedia and video artists to develop setups which allow for improvisation and performance with individually designed technology.
- TodaysArt Festival is an annual international festival for art, music and technology in The Hague.
- V2 Institute for the Unstable Media is an interdisciplinary center for art and media technology in Rotterdam. V2_ presents, produces, archives and publishes about art made with new technologies and encourages the debate on these issues. It offers a platform where artists, scientists, developers of software and hardware, researchers and theorists from various disciplines can share their findings. It is the main organizer of the Dutch Electronic Art Festival, which grew out of the Manifestations for the Unstable Media that V2_ organized since 1987.

Serbia

- Videomedeja is International New Media Art Festival founded in Novi Sad, Serbia, in 1996, produced by Video Art Association VIDEOMEDEJA. This is an annual non-profit event. As part of the program, festival focuses on art projects that combine images and sound, advanced communication, objects, in a symbiotic or avant-garde style; of videos, documentaries and short films, digital animation, media installations, interventions in the exhibition area, interactive and robotic objects, url projects, open source applications, live audiovisual performances, electronic music, advanced technologies in artistic practice.
- Resonate brings together artists, designers and educators to participate in a debate on the position of technology in art and culture. Held each year in Belgrade-Serbia, the festival provides an overview of current situation in the fields of music, visual arts and digital culture.

Spain

- Artfutura festival of Digital Culture and Creativity, founded in Barcelona in 1990, explores projects and ideas in the realm of New Media, Virtual Reality, Interactive Design and Digital Animation. Alongside the festival, a program of screenings of digital animation films runs since 2002, hosted by ArtFutura in a growing number of cities in Spain and South America.
- The Influencers is a festival about unconventional art, guerrilla communication and radical entertainment.

Switzerland

- Geneva International Film Festival // GIFF (French: Festival international du film de Genève) is devoted to cinema, television and digital creation while defending the place of the author in the artistic process. Since 1995, it offers a series of experiences focused on image, sound and new forms of narration, which include screenings, interactive installations, XR works, conferences and live performances.
- DA Z Digital Art Zurich is a festival dedicated exclusively to current and socially relevant contributions of the digital art avant-garde. It takes place annually at the end of October. Formats are exhibitions, installations, interventions, performances, demoscene, live coding, video screenings, concerts and conversations at various locations in Zurich's inner city. The festival has spin-offs. The DA Z Video Award, a competition for experimental video formats in which young artists up to the age of 30 can participate, and the DA Z Conversations, a two-day symposium on the impact of digitalisation on society and culture.

Republic of Moldova

- BOLD Fest, New Media Art Festival (RO: BOLD Fest primul festival de New Media Art din Moldova)
- DA Z Digital Art Zurich is a festival dedicated exclusively to current and socially relevant contributions of the digital art avant-garde. It takes place annually at the end of October. Formats are exhibitions, installations, interventions, performances, demoscene, live coding, video screenings, concerts and conversations at various locations in Zurich's inner city. The festival has spin-offs. The DA Z Video Award, a competition for experimental video formats in which young artists up to the age of 30 can participate, and the DA Z Conversations, a two-day symposium on the impact of digitalisation on society and culture.

United Kingdom

- RENDR Festival in Belfast, United Kingdom. Founded in 2018 RENDR created a unique nocturnal experience, celebrating creative craft and artistry in a fully immersive two-day festival exploring the space between creativity and technology. Ignite your imagination with inspiring speakers from the worlds of film, gaming, animation, immersive, and more.
- Onedotzero is a contemporary digital arts organisation based in London that aims to promote new work in moving image and motion arts, through public events, artist and content development, publishing projects, education, production, creative direction, and related consultancy services.
- TATE is an institution that houses, in a network of four art museums, the United Kingdom's national collection of British art, and international modern and contemporary art. It is not a government institution, but its main sponsor is the UK Department for Digital, Culture, Media and Sport.

== South America ==
Brazil

- FILE – Electronic Language International Festival is a festival of new media art organized yearly since 2000 in São Paulo, Brazil.

Colombia

- Festival Internacional de la Imagen is a space for meeting and discussion on topics related to visual design, electronic arts, digital audiovisual creation, digital sound, and electro-acoustic, and in general, new relationships between art, design, and science and technology.
- #NarrarElFuturo: Festival de Cine & Nuevos Medios is an academic, industry and exhibition meeting point in Bogotá that brings together local, national and regional industry professionals interested in experimenting, creating and consuming film and audiovisual content in its most recent and interesting narrative and technical trends within the digital environment; topics such as transmedia, webdocumentary, virtual, augmented and mixed reality, webseries, artificial intelligence, various forms of futurisms and other concepts of #NewMedia are some of the themes that attendees can find.

== North America ==
Canada

- FIVARS Festival of International Virtual & Augmented Reality Stories is a media festival that showcases stories or narrative forms from around the world using immersive technology that includes virtual reality, augmented reality, projection mapping and specialized audio.
- Images Festival is the largest Canadian festival for video and media art.

United States

- 01SJ Biennial distributed throughout Silicon Valley and the greater Bay Area, is North America's most significant and comprehensive showcase of work at the nexus of art and technology.
- Three Rivers Arts Festival is a Creative Industries festival celebrating the intersections of creativity and innovation in Pittsburgh, PA
- Gray Area Festival is a 3-day festival of media arts started in 2015 as an International media arts festival based in San Francisco with art show, daily presentations, workshops and night performances centered at the famous Grand Theater in SF Mission.
- The LA Freewaves experimental new media art festival is online and in Los Angeles art venues featuring local and international artists.
- New Media Film Festival an annual festival held at the Los Angeles Film School honors stories worth telling offering distribution opportunities and awards.
- Visual Collaborative A seasonal festivals platform that initially started as a traveling exhibition. Events and exhibitions feature symposium style talks, digital art, technology and live music performances.
- CURRENTS New Media produces an annual art & technology festival every June in Santa Fe, NM. This festival ranges from multimedia performances, experimental videos, robotics, mixed reality, AI and more.
- Code:ART Festival is a biennial interactive Public Art festival held in Palo Alto, California.

== Oceania ==
Australia

- Electrofringe is a festival of digital, electronic and new media arts.

== See also ==
- List of film festivals
- List of electronic music festivals
