= Estiatorio Milos Singapore =

estiatorio Milos Singapore
- Interactive map of estiatorio Milos Singapore

Restaurant information
- Owner: Costas Spiliadis
- Food type: Greek, Mediterranean
- Rating: 4.5 on Google
- Coordinates: 1.28589°N 103.85955°E
- Seating capacity: 155
- Reservations: Yes
- Website: https://www.marinabaysands.com/restaurants/estiatorio-milos.html

estiatorio Milos Singapore is a Greek fine-dining restaurant at Marina Bay Sands in Singapore. The restaurant is one of the group’s locations and marks the brand’s first foray into Asia.

== History ==
The original Milos was founded in Montreal in 1979 by Greek-born restaurateur Costas Spiliadis, as a way to share his Greek heritage with the world.

The restaurant gained international recognition and expanded globally into 11 other locations, including New York, London, Dubai, Las Vegas, Athens, Miami, Los Cabos, Los Angeles, Palm Beach and Toronto, creating the $100 million global Greek restaurant group.

== Food ==
The restaurant is known for Greek cuisine rooted in traditional preparation methods, with a focus on high-quality ingredients sourced from fishermen and farmers across Greece, the Mediterranean, and local markets. It is known throughout the world for its seafood, including fish and shellfish flown in from the Mediterranean daily. A highlight of the dining experience is its fish market concept, featuring over 15 varieties of wild-caught fish, such as cherna (grouper), fagri (red sea bream), lavraki (sea bass) and alfonsino for diners to choose from. The seafood can be prepared in various ways, including grilled, fried or baked in sea salt. Adjacent to the fish market is a vegetable display.

Signature dishes include Astakomakaronada, a lobster linguine pasta prepared in Athenian-style. The menu also features a wide range of salads, traditional Greek classics and desserts such as Greek Yoghurt Ice Cream with walnuts and honey.

== Drinks ==
Beyond food, the restaurant also offers 350 to 400 labels, the widest variety of Greek wine in Singapore, sourced from diverse regions across the country. Many of which are made from indigenous grape varieties, such as Assyrtiko, Xinomavro and Agiorgitiko. Other than wine, it also offers cocktails made with Greek produce.

== Restaurant Design ==
The restaurant’s design draws inspiration from the Aegean coastal aesthetic, incorporating materials such as marble and wood, complemented by neutral hues and coastal influences.

== Awards and Accolades ==
The restaurant was featured in the 2026 Black Pearl Restaurant Guide, where it received one diamond. The guide is published by Meituan and is often compared to the Michelin Guide.
