= Kim Rees =

American computer scientist

- Born: Kim Markegard; November 26, 1970 (age 55)
- Citizenship: American
- Education: New York University
- Awards: APDU Data Viz Award
- Scientific career
- Fields: Data Visualization, Computer Science
- Workplaces: Google, JP Morgan Chase, Capital One, Periscopic

Kim Rees is an American computer scientist and data visualization professional located in the Washington DC area. She is currently the head of UX for Google Cloud Data & Analytics. Prior to joining Google, Rees co-founded the data visualization firm, Periscopic and worked there for 13 years. Rees is perhaps best known for her work on a Periscopic project visualizing gun deaths.

== Career ==
Rees started her career after graduating from New York University with a B.A. in Computer science in 1993. She worked as a programmer at Interfilm from 1994 to 1996; then moved on to R/GA until late 1997. For the next seven years, she worked independently as a programmer and strategist, working primarily in languages such as c++ and Java. She worked for clients such as Chipotle Mexican Grill and Warner Bros. She worked as an advisor to the US Congressional Budget Office.

Rees was one of the first practitioners of interactive data visualization. She has spoken at major conferences, including the Eyeo festival and Strata. She served as a judge for the data visualization competitions WikiViz Challenge 2011 and CommArts Interactive Annual 2012.

Rees is known for her work with Periscopic, her data visualization company that aims to "do good with data." In particular, the visualization US Gun Deaths received a lot of media mentions. As an expert in data and visualization, Rees is often called on to comment about current events. She argues that "Data is a language... a means to convey an opinion, an argument." and uses that philosophy to inform how she works with data and imagery.

She was a guest on the Data Stories podcast, hosted by Enrico Bertini and Moritz Stefaner.

== Awards ==
- 2017 APDU Data Viz Award, Government Category
- 2010 VAST Challenge
