= Resonate (festival) =

Resonate was an annual festival for art and digital culture in Belgrade, Serbia, usually held over five days at the end of April. The first edition was held in 2012. It was the biggest media art festival in Serbia.

The festival was part of a collaborative project We Are Europe (funded by the EU) together with festivals in other countries such as Sónar (Barcelona), c/o pop (Cologne), TodaysArt, Elevate, Insomnia, Nuits Sonores, and Reworks. Resonate co-curates at some of these festivals too with independent programs and vice versa c/o pop, TodaysArt, Elevate and Sónar co-curated wing programs at Resonate. The festival has several activities during daytime and in the evening: a conference, varying exhibition formats, a film and video program, performances, and workshops.

== Non-payment scandal ==
In the run-up to the 2018 edition of the festival, it emerged that many artists, both local and international, had not been paid, some for years. A group of local artists even set up the Facebook group Still Unpaid At Resonate Festival, where it then emerged that the travel agent was also owed more than €28,000 for flights. As a result, some artists began pulling out in solidarity, leading to cancelled shows.

Despite this, the organisers advertised a further iteration in 2019 but owing to the brewing scandal the event was cancelled. As of September 2020, the festival's website is no longer active and the URL is available for sale.

== Line-up ==
- 2012 - Kim Gordon & Ikue Mori, Alva Noto, onedotzero, United Visual Artists, WARP, Karsten Schmidt, Rafaël Rozendaal, Nicholas Felton, Régine Debatty, Josh Nimoy, Blixa Bargeld
- 2013 - Casey Reas, Joachim Sauter (ART+COM), Zimoun, Moritz Stefaner, Zach Gage, Golan Levin, Raquel Meyers, Anthony Dunne (RCA), Revital Cohen, Karsten Schmidt, Spaces of Play, Memo Akten (MarshmallowLaserFeast), Andreas Müller (Nanikawa), James Bridle, Liam Young (The Unknown Fields Division), Andreas Gysin, Greg J Smith, Kyle McDonald, Peter Kirn, Studio NAND, onedotzero
- 2014 - Justin Windle, Moritz Stefaner, Jonathan Puckey and Luna Maurer (Moniker), Theodore Spyropoulos (Minimaforms, AADRL), Cyril Diagne (Lab212), Eno Henze, Joshua Noble, Marko Nastic, Matthieu Cherubini, Mark McKeague, Rachel Binx and Sha Hwang, Resonate Concentio, Sasha Gavrilova (Stain), Daito Manabe, Visual Music and the Geometries of the Unseen, Joanie Lemercier, Lanac / The Chain - Simonida Rajcevic, Generative Strategies, Choreographic Coding - Hosted by NODE Forum for Digital Arts, Joe Gerhardt (Semiconductor), Johannes Timpernagel (schnellebuntebilder), Ilija Ludvig, Andrea Cuius, Sunni Pavlovic (That Game Company), Jaume Sánchez, onedotzero_rewind, Andreas Gysin, Manuel Jimenez Garcia (Bartlett), Andreas Schlegel, Elliot Woods and Mimi Son (Kimchi and Chips), Michael Szivos (SOFTlab), Visual Music, Wesley Grubbs (Pitch Interactive), Karsten Schmidt, Julian Adenauer, Aaron Koblin, Yuri Suzuki, Paul Prudence, Monosaccharide, Energy Accreted Ecologies, Ways of Seeing, Pablo Garcia, Richard Banks, Benedikt Groß, Kyle McDonald, Bryan Chapman, Catalysts, Patricia Jones, Transcranial - Klaus Obermaier, Daito Manabe and Kyle McDonald
- 2015 - Senyawa, Eric Raynaud, Automatic Orchestra, Svetlana Maras, Andrea Cuius, Emika, Wouter van Veldhoven, Machinefabriek, Yuri Landman, Sculpture, Lichens, Ben Frost, Olga Bell, Blixa Bargeld, Fennesz, and others. Special guest speaker: Bill Drummond (KLF)
- 2016 - Squarepusher, Omar Souleyman, Holly Herndron, Alec Empire, Hans-Joachim Roedelius, Rashad Becker, Ninos Du Brasil, Daniel Miller, Pierre Bastien, Dopplereffekt, Dadub, Peter Van Hoesen, Jan Nemecek, Mariska de Groot, Nicholas Felton, Moment Factory, Chris Sugrue, Pablo Garcia, Romain Tardy, Kimchi And Chips, Murat Pak, Atau Tanaka, Daniel Hirschmann, Phoenix Perry, Rebecca Fiebrink, Artists & Engineers, Domestic Data Streamers, Ishac Bertran, Bethany Koby (Technology Will Save Us), Andreas Müller, Karsten Schmidt, Neil Mendoza, Darsha Hewitt, Jonathan Wohl, Random Studio, Pe Lang, Memo Akten, James Auger, Shane Walter, onedotzero, Jakob Bak (CIID), Dennis P Paul (HfK), Joreg (vvvv), Cathrine Kramer, Playmodes, Kevin Walker (RCA), Daniel Sciboz (HEAD), Gael Hugo (ECAL)
- 2017 - Adisson Groove, Alba G. Corral and Regen, Anna Von Hausswolff, Biosphere, Feloneezy, Gabber Eleganza, Jackie Dagger, Yuri Landman, Jichael Mackson, Kristijan Šajković, Lee Ranaldo (Sonic Youth), Lil Taty, Marko Nastic, Mirko Lazovic & Nenad Popov, Mykki Blanco, Nemanja Aćimović, Peder Mannerfelt, Rastko Lazic, Roly Porter, Stephen O’Malley, STEPNIAK, Stevie Whisper aka Stefan Unkovic, Vvhile, Woo, Rosa Menkman, and others.
