= ArtScience Museum =

Museum in Singapore

Coordinates: 1°17′10″N 103°51′33″E

Singapore ArtScience Museum 新加坡艺术科学博物馆 Muzium Seni Sains Singapura சிங்கப்பூர் கலை, அறிவியல் அருங்காட்சியகம்

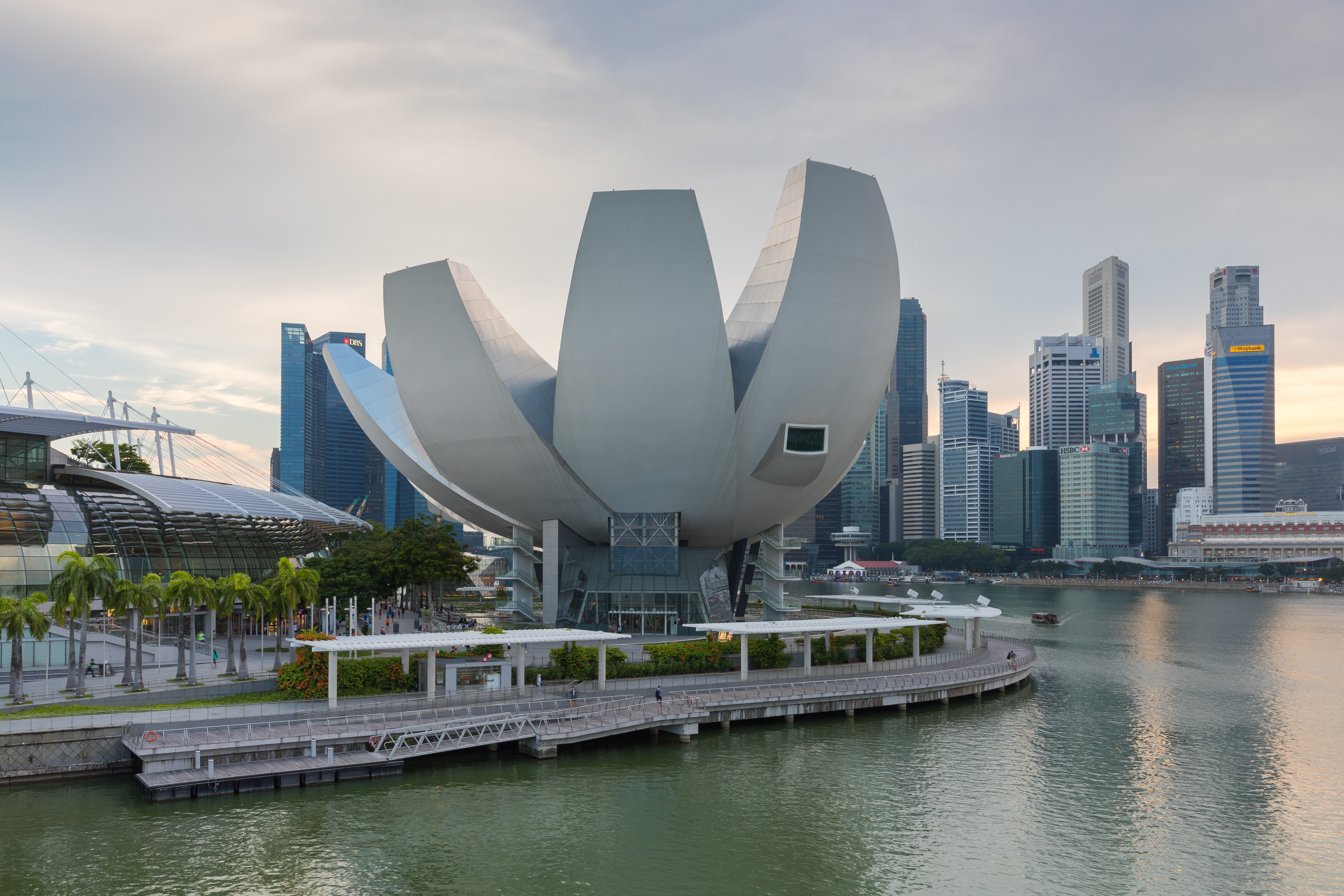
- Established: 17 February 2011; 15 years ago
- Location: 6 Bayfront Avenue, Singapore 018974
- Vice President of Attractions: Angelita Teo
- Public transit access: CC34 DT16 Bayfront
- Website: www.marinabaysands.com/ArtScienceMuseum

The ArtScience Museum is a museum within the integrated resort of Marina Bay Sands in the Downtown Core of the Central Area in Singapore. Opened on 17 February 2011 by Singapore's prime minister, Lee Hsien Loong, it features exhibitions that blend art, science, culture and technology. It is the largest private museum in Singapore.

The museum mainly hosts touring exhibitions curated by other museums, in addition to a permanent exhibition created in conjunction with art collective teamLab.

== History ==
On 12 November 2025, its partnership with PGLang's creative agency Project 3 was officially announced, intended for the museum's rebrand and current-to-upcoming shows.

== Architecture ==
The architecture is said to be a form reminiscent of a lotus flower. It was designed by Moshe Safdie and features an exterior made of fibre-reinforced plastic supported internally by a steel lattice.

Referred to as "The Welcoming Hand of Singapore" by Las Vegas Sands chairman Sheldon Adelson, the ArtScience Museum is anchored by a round base in the middle, with ten extensions referred to as "fingers" in the shape of a flower. The design concept for each finger denotes various gallery spaces sporting skylights at the "fingertips", which are included as sustainable illumination for the curved interior walls.

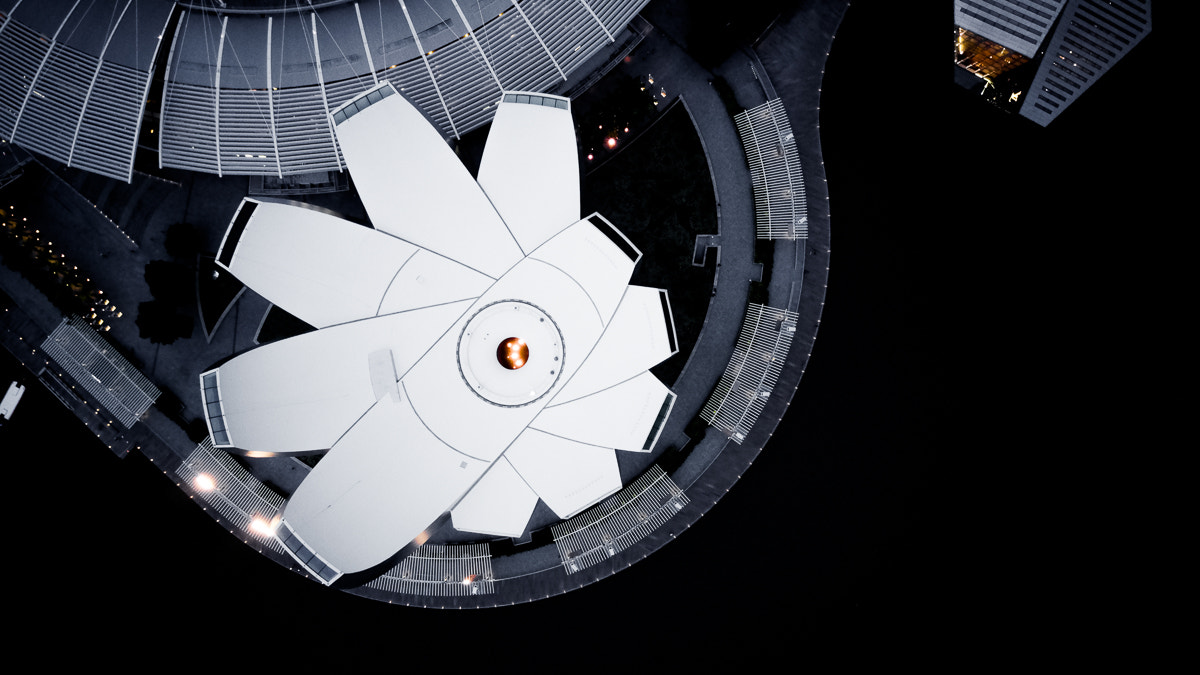
Aerial view of the ArtScience Museum

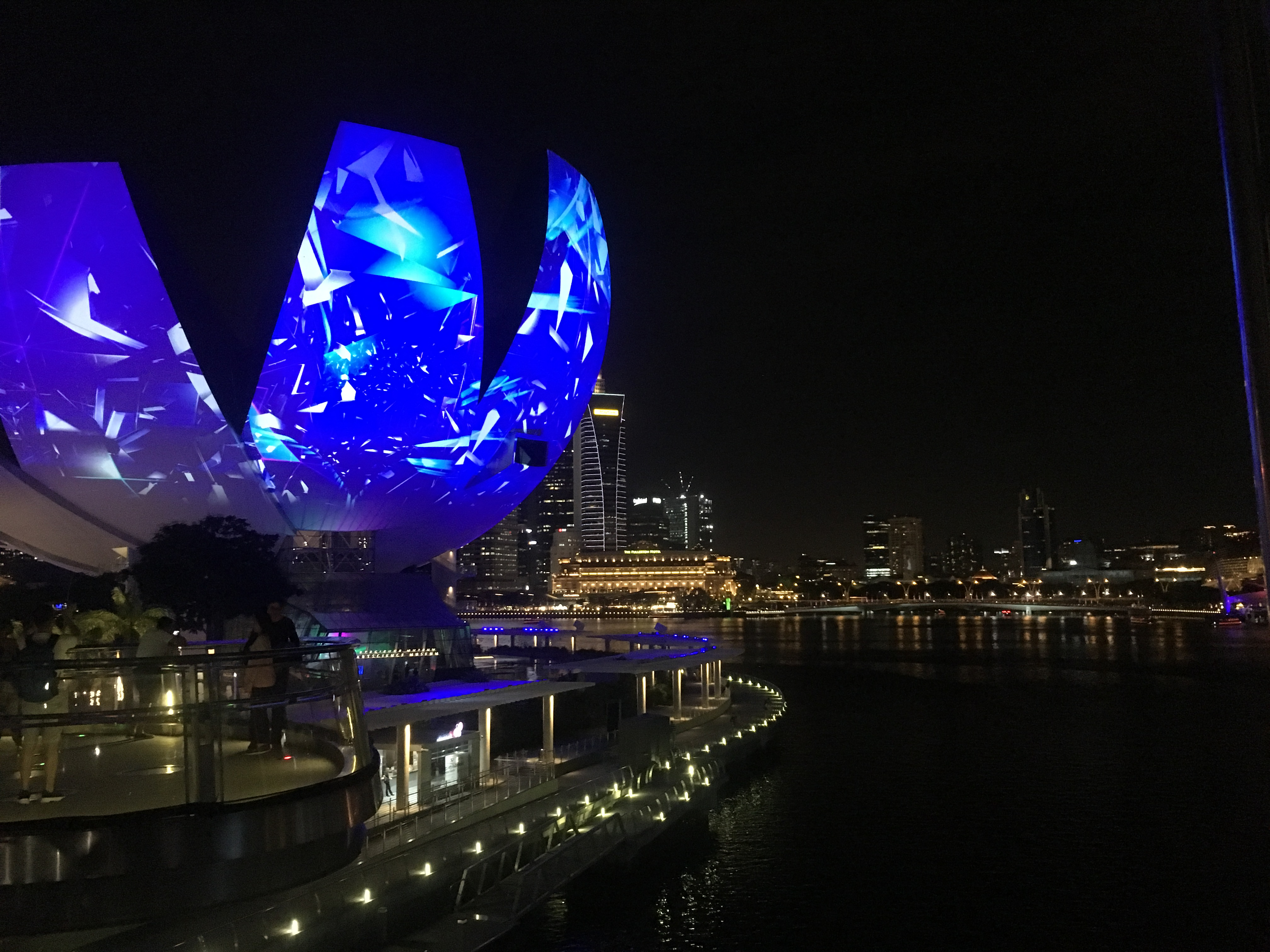
Night view of Singapore Art Science Museum, February 2019

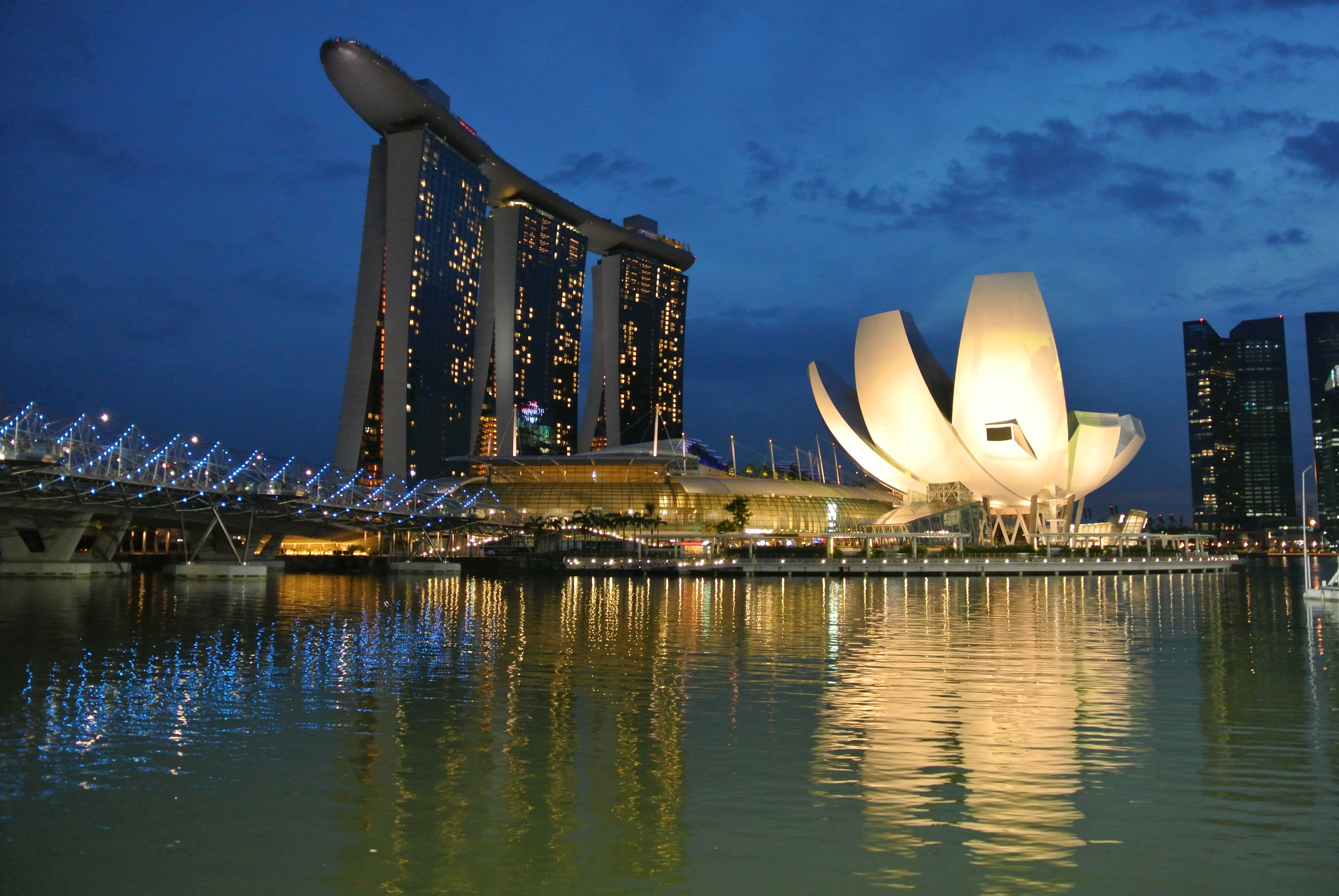
The ArtScience Museum at twilight

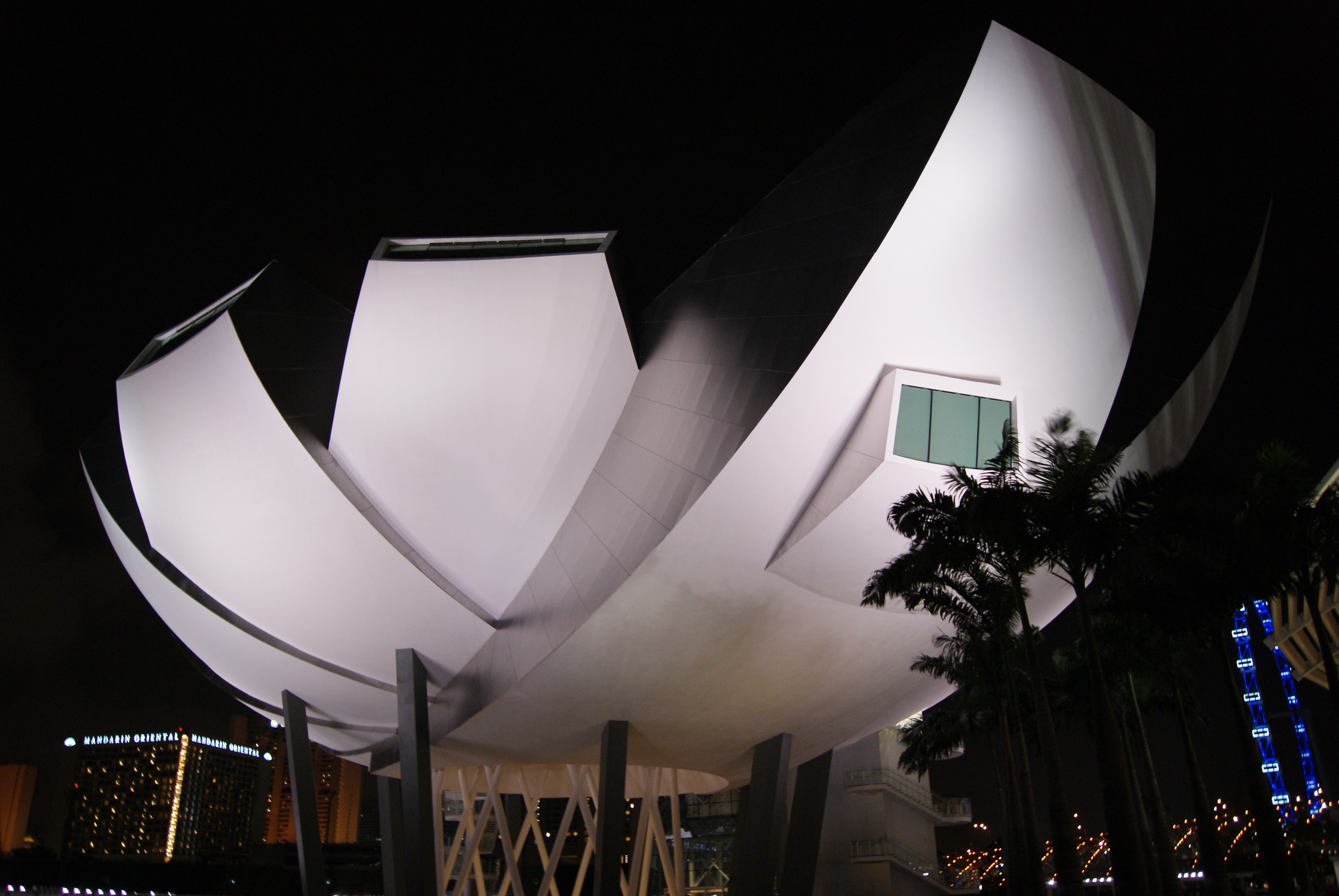
A night view of the museum photographed in February 2011

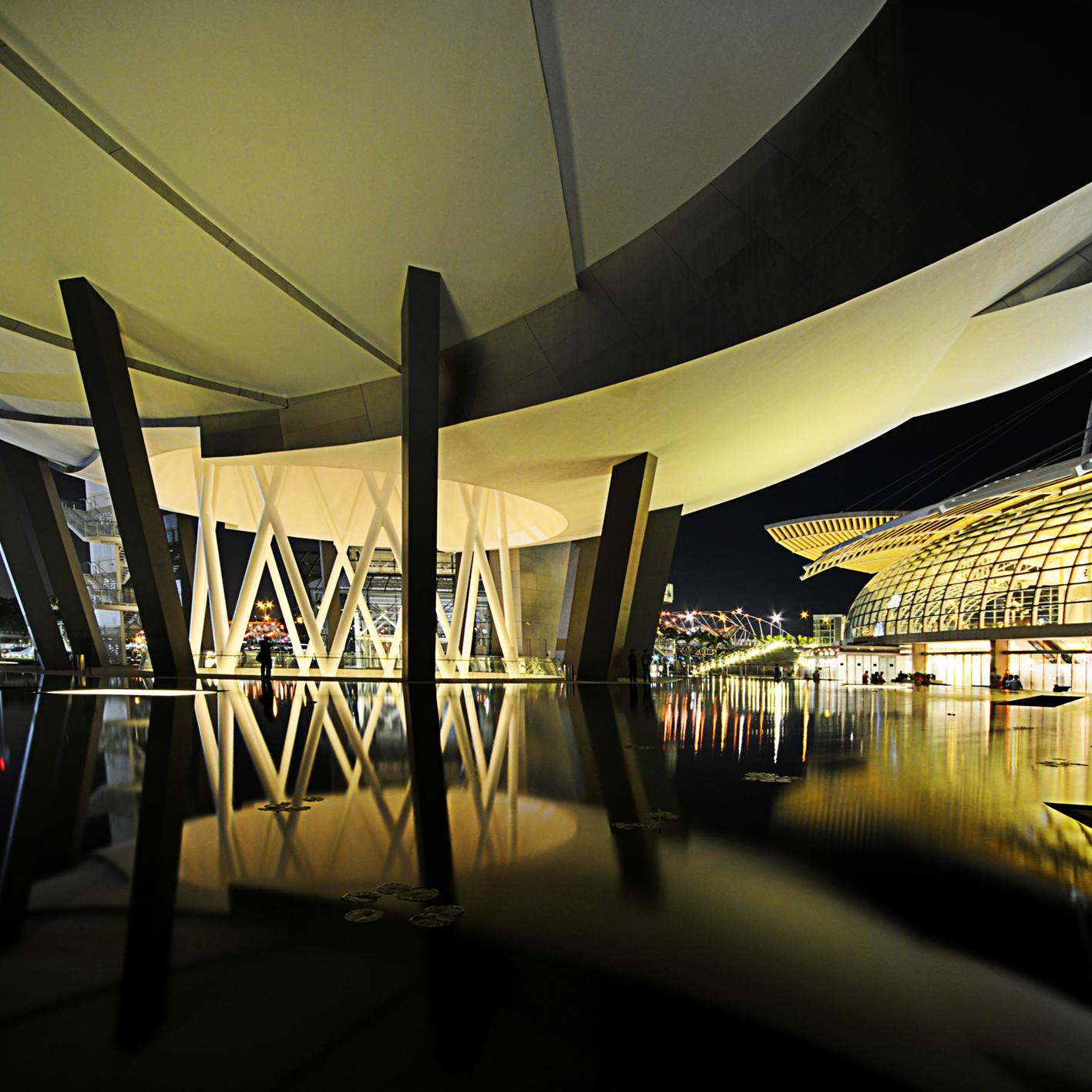
View from below

=== Gallery spaces ===
The ArtScience Museum has 21 gallery spaces with a total area of 64,583 square feet (6,000 square meters).

=== Sustainability features ===
Rainwater is harvested and channelled down the centre of the building, flowing through its bowl-shaped roof into a reflecting pond at the lowest level of the building. The rainwater is then recycled for use in the building's restrooms.

== Exhibitions ==
Information of past and current exhibitions can be found on the museum's website. A typical configuration of two to three exhibitions, including the permanent exhibition, is held concurrently.

=== Permanent exhibition ===
The only permanent exhibition in the museum is Future World, which was created in collaboration with art collective teamLab. It occupies the majority of the Basement 2 galleries.

=== Touring exhibitions ===
Non-exhaustive list of touring exhibitions at the ArtScience Museum
Exhibition	Period	Presenter
Traveling the Silk Road: Ancient Pathway to the Modern World	19 Feb – 27 March 2011	American Museum of Natural History
Genghis Khan: The Exhibition	19 Feb – 10 April 2011	Rex Exhibitions
Shipwrecked: Tang Treasures and Monsoon Winds	19 Feb – 2 October 2011	Arthur M. Sackler Gallery, Smithsonian Institution, Asian Civilisations Museum, National Heritage Board, Singapore Tourism Board
Van Gogh Alive - the Exhibition	16 Apr – 9 October 2011	Grande Exhibitions, VisionsCom
Dalí: Mind of a Genius – The Exhibition	14 May – 13 November 2011	Stratton Foundation
Titanic: The Artifact Exhibition	29 October 2011 – 29 April 2012	Premier Exhibitions, RMS Titanic, Inc.
Cartier Time Art	14 December 2011 – 12 February 2012	Cartier S.A.
Andy Warhol: 15 Minutes Eternal	17 Mar – 21 October 2012	The Andy Warhol Museum
Harry Potter: The Exhibition	2 Jun – 30 September 2012	Global Experience Specialists, Inc., Warner Bros. Consumer Products
Outside In: A Magnum Photos Showcase	10 October 2012 – 17 March 2013	Magnum Photos
The Art of the Brick	17 November 2012 – 14 April 2013	Nathan Sawaya
Fujians: The Blue Ocean Legacy	24 November 2012 – 28 February 2013	Singapore Hokkien Huay Kuan
Mummy: Secrets of the Tomb	27 Apr – 4 November 2013	British Museum
Essential Eames: A Herman Miller Exhibition	29 June 2013 – 16 February 2014	Eames Office, Herman Miller
50 Greatest Photographs of National Geographic	17 Aug – 27 October 2013	National Geographic Society
Dinosaurs: Dawn to Extinction	25 Jan – 27 July 2014	American Museum of Natural History, PrimeSCI!, San Juan National Science Museum
Annie Leibovitz A Photographer's Life 1990 - 2005	18 Apr – 19 October 2014	-
An Ocean of Possibilities	31 Oct – 28 December 2014	Singapore International Photography Festival 2014, Noor Der Licht
Da Vinci: Shaping the Future	2015	-
Prudential Singapore Eye	2015	-
Future Masters	24 Jan – 1 February 2015	Samsung Masterpieces
Attack on Titan: The Exhibition	19 Feb – 9 August 2022	-
Human+: The Future of Our Species	20 May – 15 October 2017	Science Gallery, Dublin.
Iris Van Herpen: Sculpting the Senses	15 Mar – 10 August 2025	-
The World of Studio Ghibli	4 October 2024 – 2 February 2025	-

== Feature exhibitions ==
The ArtScience Museum features gallery spaces totalling 50,000 square feet (6,000 square meters) for exhibits from combined art/science, media/technology, as well as design/architecture motifs.

Permanent exhibits include objects indicative of the accomplishments of both the arts and the sciences through the ages, along the lines of Leonardo da Vinci's Flying Machine, a Kongming Lantern, and a high-tech robotic fish. The museum opened with an exhibition of a collection of the Belitung shipwreck cargo, and Tang dynasty treasures that were discovered and preserved by Tilman Walterfang of Seabed Explorations NZ Ltd.

=== Belitung shipwreck treasure ===
Tilman Walterfang and his team found the Tang dynasty artifacts in the Gaspar Strait in 1998 among the Belitung shipwreck, a large 9th-century Arabian dhow that sunk around 830 AD. For the next six years, they were desalinated, conserved and researched by his company Seabed Explorations Ltd in New Zealand. They were eventually purchased for around US$32 million.

An accurate reproduction of the Arab dhow ship, named The Jewel of Muscat, was presented by the Sultanate of Oman to the government and people of Singapore.

The items in the collection on tour accurately reflects the assortment and magnitude of the find and its global inter-cultural significance; this is the single largest consignment of Tang dynasty export goods ever discovered. The find includes some of the oldest cobalt-blue-and-white ceramics made in China, several gold items made with Arabic designs and swastikas, jars filled with spices and incense resins, bronze mirrors, thousands of glazed bowls, ewers and other fine ceramics, as well as lead ingots. The pièce de résistance of the exhibition is a small cache of intricately tooled vessels of silver and gold, which are regarded as unparalleled in quality and design from the period.

=== World tour of Tang dynasty shipwreck treasure ===
With support from the estate of Tan Sri Khoo Teck Puat, the cargo of the Arab dhow, which was used as the true and original model, is now generally referred to among academic circles as the "Tang Shipwreck Treasure: Singapore's Maritime Collection".

=== Programmes and experiences ===
In addition to exhibitions, the museum also hosts progammes, including screenings at its Cinema and VR Gallery. Experiences, such as activities held in the ArtScience Laboratory, are also available.

== See also ==
- The Maritime Experiential Museum
- Architecture of Singapore
