= Maison Boulud =

Restaurant information
- Food type: French
- Rating: 4.5 on Google
- Reservations: Yes
- Website: Singapore: https://www.marinabaysands.com/restaurants/maison-boulud.html

Maison Boulud is a French fine-dining restaurant concept by Michelin-starred chef and restaurateur Daniel Boulud. The restaurant is known for its interpretations of classic French cuisine.

== History ==
The original Maison Boulud opened in Montreal, Canada, in 2012.

Before Maison Boulud's expansion into Singapore, Daniel Boulud's first restaurant in the country, Db Bistro & Oyster Bar, opened at Marina Bay Sands in 2010. The restaurant closed in January 2024 to make way for a new dining concept similar to his Michelin-starred Café Boulud in New York.

Maison Boulud subsequently opened at Marina Bay Sands in February 2024.

== Design ==
Drawing on its name, the design of Maison Boulud combines elements of the French Riviera with Mediterranean-influenced finishes. The restaurant has been recognised for its design and was listed among the “most beautiful restaurants to dine at in Singapore” by Tatler.

== Food ==
Notable dishes from Db Bistro & Oyster Bar, such as the Seafood Platter, have been retained on Maison Boulud's menu. The menu includes classic French offerings such as charcuterie and pâté en croûte.

Beyond food, Maison Boulud is also known for its wines sourced from France and other international wine regions.

== Awards and Accolades ==
Maison Boulud was featured in the Singapore Michelin Guide in 2024 and 2025, and the Tatler Dining Guide in 2025. In 2024 and 2025, the restaurant also received the Wine Spectator Best of Award of Excellence.
