= 01SJ Biennial =

The 01SJ Biennial is a multi-disciplinary, multi-venue event of visual and performing arts, the moving image, public art, and interactive digital media held biannually in San Jose, California, curated by ZERO1's artistic director Steve Dietz.

== History ==
The inaugural Biennial took place in 2006 in conjunction with the 13th International Symposium on Electronic Art (ISEA). It drew upwards of 20,000 attendees from around the globe and contributed $6 million to the local economy. The second 01SJ Biennial in 2008 drew 45,000 attendees, generated $9 million in revenue for the local economy, and established the Biennial as a significant new festival of contemporary art.

The Biennial's primary venues are located in downtown San Jose but with each subsequent Biennial more satellite projects and parallel programs have been added in cities throughout Silicon Valley.

The 2010 01SJ Biennial occurred September 16–19, 2010 and is themed "Build Your Own World", which posits that the future is not about what's next; it's about what we can build to ensure that what's next matters.
