= Estiatorio Milos Miami Beach =

Greek Seafood Restaurant in Miami Beach

- Interactive map of Estiatorio Milos Miami Beach

Restaurant information
- Established: August 2012; 13 years ago
- Location: 730 1st Street, Miami Beach, Miami-Dade County, United States
- Coordinates: 25°46′11.597″N 80°8′7.518″W
- Reservations: yes
- Website: https://www.estiatoriomilos.com/location/miami/

Estiatorio Milos Miami Beach is a Mediterranean restaurant that opened in May 2012 for a soft launch and officially began full operations in August 2012. It is the fifth location founded by Costas Spiliadis. The restaurant includes a seafood display from which diners may select items. As of 2025, there are 12 locations of estiatorio Milos worldwide.

== Layout ==
The interior, designed by Jeffrey Beers International, features white linens, natural wood, and large windows. The kitchen is open to the dining area, and marble used throughout the space was sourced from the mountains of Dionysus. This location also includes a market offering ingredients for purchase.

== Menu ==
A fixed-price menu is available during limited hours on weekdays and Sundays. The wine selection includes bottles imported from Greece.

== Accolades ==
- Listed in the Michelin Guide for the Miami Beach area
- Included in Miami New Times’ top 100 restaurants in Miami for 2025
- Ranked by PureWow among South Beach restaurants
- Featured by OceanDrive in a list of seafood restaurants in Miami

== See also ==
- Estiatorio Milos Las Vegas
- List of restaurants in Miami
