= Cathrine Kramer =

Norwegian artist, designer and curator

- Education: Royal College of Art
- Occupations: Artist, Designer, Curator
- Movement: Critical design, Hybrid arts, New Media art, Bioart
- Website: callmecat.com

Cathrine Maclennan Kramer is a Norwegian artist, designer and curator. She co-founded the Center for Genomic Gastronomy. She has worked extensively with the Science Gallery Dublin as a curator.

== Curatorial work ==
=== Human+ (2011-2018) ===
Human+: The Future of Our Species was an exhibition that premiered at the Science Gallery, Dublin in 2011. In 2015 it traveled to Centre de Cultura Contemporània de Barcelona in Barcelona where Kramer became lead curator for the expanded exhibition, contributing a new curatorial essay for the catalogue. In 2017 the exhibition traveled to ArtScience Museum in Singapore and in 2018 it was expanded for the Palazzo delle Esposizioni in Rome.

=== EDIBLE Exhibition (2012) ===
EDIBLE: The Taste of Things to Come (2012) was an exhibition curated by Cathrine Kramer and Zack Denfeld of the Center for Genomic Gastronomy at Science Gallery, Trinity College Dublin. In addition to exhibits, the show included events like curated meals, talks from local and international foodies, and selected recipes. A major component of the exhibition were the feeding times, prepared by the in-gallery kitchen, where visitors got the chance to experience various ingredients and curious tasters such as the vegan ortolan created by the Center for Genomic Gastronomy.

== Art ==
=== The Cloud Project (2009-2011) ===
The Cloud Project was a modified ice-cream van that presented a series of experiments to make clouds snow ice-cream. Inspired by developments in planetary-scale engineering, it pointed to ambitions surrounding the human desire to control the weather. Developed in collaboration with Zoe Papadopoulou, its purpose was as a tool for public engagement, performance, and spectacle, with the goal to amaze and inspire people to think critically about their relationship to emerging technologies and weather modification. The van was exhibited in Ireland, the UK and Beijing, China.
