= Costas Spiliadis =

Greek chef and restaurateur (born 1947)

- Born: 1947; Patras, Greece
- Education: Concordia University
- Culinary career
- Cooking style: Greek cuisine
- Current restaurant(s): Estiatorio Milos (1979), Estiatorio Milos Midtown New York (1997), Xenodocheio Milos (2004), Estiatorio Milos Las Vegas (2010), Estiatorio Milos Miami Beach (2012), Estiatorio Milos London (2015), Estiatorio Milos Los Cabos (2019), Estiatorio Milos Hudson Yards (2019), Estiatorio Milos Las Vegas (2021), Estiatorio Milos Dubai (2023), Estiatorio Milos Toronto (2024), Estiatorio Milos Singapore (2024), Estiatorio Milos West Palm Beach (2025)
- Television show(s): CBS This Morning (2019); Martha Cooks (2023)
- Award(s) won: International Cuisine – Costas Spiliadis 2017 The Concierge Choice Awards – won , Gastronomy – Costas Spiliadis 2021 The Argo Awards – won
- Website: www.estiatoriomilos.com/costas-spiliadis/

Costas Spiliadis is a chef and restaurateur who runs a chain of Greek restaurants called Estiatorio Milos. Two of his restaurants and his hotel are in the Michelin Guide.

== Early life ==
Spiliadis was born in Patras, Greece in 1947 and immigrated to New York in 1966 to study criminology at New York University and escape chaos in Greece caused by the Iouliana of 1965. After failing to find a Greek community he could connect with in New York, Costas moved to Montreal in 1971 and became a radio programmer for Radio Centre-Ville, a Concordia University graduate and a parent. He had a hard time finding high-quality Greek restaurants in the area, so he decided to open Milos in December 1979 on Park Avenue. The Spiliadis family has full control over the Estiatorio Milos brand, due to Costas's fear of not recognizing his soul in his restaurants.

== Restaurants ==
- Estiatorio Milos (1979)
- Estiatorio Milos Midtown New York (1997)
- Xenodocheio Milos (2004)
- Estiatorio Milos Las Vegas At The Cosmopolitan (2010)
- Estiatorio Milos Miami Beach (2012)
- Estiatorio Milos London (2015)
- Estiatorio Milos Los Cabos (2019)
- Estiatorio Milos Hudson Yards (2019)
- Estiatorio Milos Las Vegas At The Venetian (2021)
- Estiatorio Milos Dubai (2023)
- Estiatorio Milos Toronto (2024)
- Estiatorio Milos Singapore (2024)
- Estiatorio Milos West Palm Beach (2025)

== Awards ==
Costas Spiliadis has won two awards.

- 2017 winner of The Concierge Choice Awards’ International Cuisine category
- 2021 winner of The Argo Award for Gastronomy

== Media Appearances ==
Costas Spiliadis made an appearance on CBS This Morning in 2019 to prepare some of his signature dishes for the cast. He also appeared on Martha Stewart’s show, Martha Cooks in 2023.
