= Estiatorio Milos Las Vegas =

Greek Restaurant in Las Vegas

- Interactive map of Estiatorio Milos Las Vegas

Restaurant information
- Established: December 15, 2010; 15 years ago
- Owner: Costas Spiliadis
- Food type: Greek, Mediterranean
- Location: 3355 Las Vegas Boulevard, Las Vegas, United States
- Coordinates: 36°7′18.146″N 115°10′9.606″W
- Seating capacity: 175
- Reservations: yes
- Website: https://www.venetianlasvegas.com/dining/restaurants/estiatorio-milos.html

Estiatorio Milos Las Vegas, (styled estiatorio Milos) is a Mediterranean restaurant that first opened at The Cosmopolitan Las Vegas when the hotel debuted in December 2010. The original location closed in 2020 and relocated to The Venetian on March 15, 2021. As of 2025, there are 12 locations of estiatorio Milos worldwide.

== Layout/Construction ==
The interior of estiatorio Milos location at the Venetian was designed by Alain Carle and Jeffrey Beers International, the same designer as the Cosmopolitan location. Construction at The Venetian started August 2020 with a $10 million budget. Milos took over a 13,624 square foot space that previously housed a different seafood restaurant called Aquaknox. Owner Costas Spiliadis had minimal in-person involvement in construction due to COVID-19 travel restrictions but saw progress through Zoom calls. Marble from Mount Pentelicus outside Athens and Oak from Denmark were the primary materials used in construction. Genevie Durano of Las Vegas Weekly explained the environment difference from the Cosmopolitan to the Venetian as such, “Where the original Milos was tucked away in a corner at the Cosmopolitan, offering a relatively subdued dining experience, its new home is a bright and expansive open space with a massive bar at its center and a bright and bustling open kitchen.”

== Menu ==
Milos at The Venetian offers a prix-fixe lunch, fish flown in from the Mediterranean, a fruit and vegetable market, a raw bar, a yogurt room, and Greek wines. Owner Costas Spiliadis had a unique goal for this location of Estiatorio Milos: ”I want to emphasize the quality of the fish, and the characteristics of the different fish in their raw form.”

== See also ==
- Estiatorio Milos Miami Beach
- List of restaurants in the Las Vegas Valley
