= International Image Festival =

2010 design forum in Colombia

International Image Festival Festival Internacional de la Imagen
- Dates: 13 April through 17 April 2010.
- Locations: Manizales, Colombia
- Website: festivaldelaimagen.com

The International Image Festival is a space for meeting and discussion on topics related to visual design, electronic art, digital audiovisual creation, digital sound, and electro-acoustic, and in general, new relationships between art, design, and science and technology. Proposing an open forum for discussion in areas of digital creation, integrating art, science and technology through different activities and projects, such as: art and science conferences, seminars and workshops, calls for national and international events including new music concerts, analysis sessions, exhibitions, publications and webcast initiatives.

The 9th edition took place from 13 to 17 April 2010, in Manizales, Colombia.

== Festival ==
The International Image Festival is organized in various sections:

=== International Seminar ===
Central event of the International Image Festival, which presents different looks at issues of design, art, science and technology, from the papers of theorists, researchers, filmmakers and academics, who are invited to share their products and experiences.

=== Soundscapes ===
Music, sound experiments, and audiovisuals proposals have several theme-music-technology image. Contemporary music, sound experimental trends, technology as a tool, advanced processes of composition, the remix as an art, noise and soundscape and postproduction as creation, are some of the concepts explored in the soundscape.

=== Workshops ===
Space where attendees can interact with the international guests in small workshops related to the specialty area of each guest.

=== Exhibitions ===
Space in which artworks and installations are displayed, related to art, design, communication and new technologies.

==== Interactive Installations ====
===== INDIAN TRIP =====
Indian Trip is an interactive installation that allows users to explore different parts of India, through sounds, images and video.

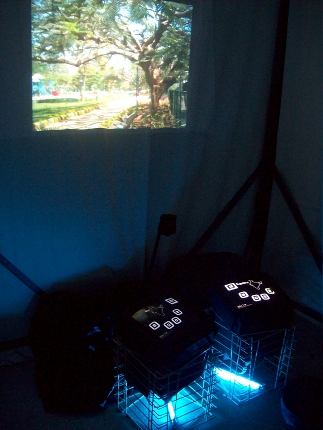

This interactive installation was presented at the Ninth international festival image.

===== HAL 9000 =====
HAL 9000 is an interactive installation in which four different atmospheres are created by certain images and sounds that inhabit it. This proposal works with a technology called augmented reality which is a representation model for the handling, integration and interaction of images, which merges the everyday reality with virtual reality. By allowing interaction markers and total control of the projections and sounds by those who are there.

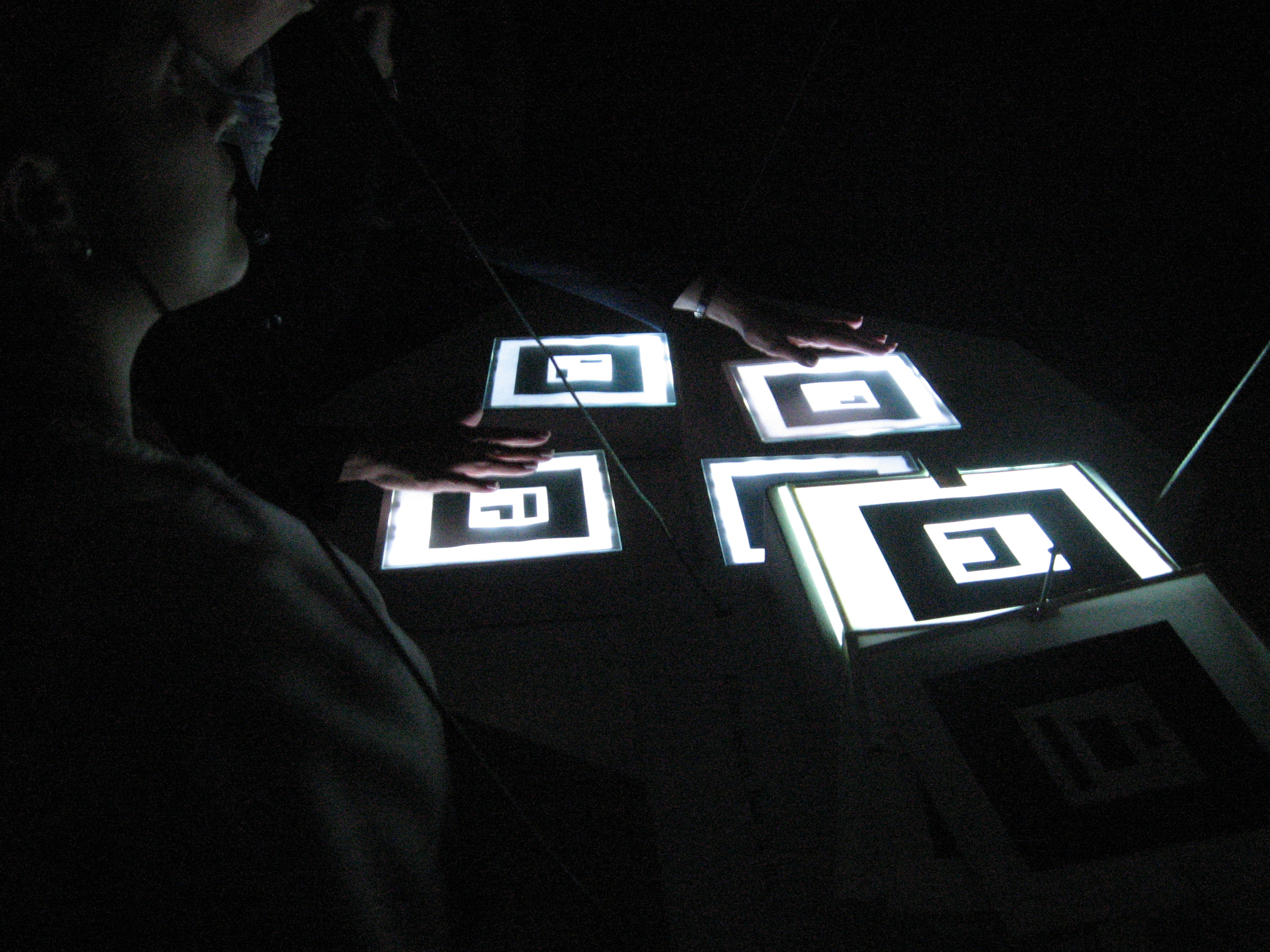

This interactive installation was presented at the seventh international festival image.

=== Digital cinema ===
Contemporary experiences of Latin American and global audiovisual creation. Videos, interactive web formats, non-linear narratives and documentaries open are some of the expressions that will introduce this area open to contemporary audiovisual.

=== Monographic show of Media Art ===
Is a space for the expression of contemporary practices in electronic media creation, also reflects on the role of digital visual creations in the information society and aims, not only as a space for critical analysis, but also as the place of exchange of experiences in different languages around the narrative and the creative processes generated in the new media.

=== Calls ===
==== Sound bridges ====
Call all the creators who wish, without limitation of quantity to contribute with sounds that take into consideration one way or another transport ideas of information and knowledge and dialogue in constant construction.

==== Monographic show of media art ====
The monographic show of media art is a space for the expression of contemporary practices in electronic media creation, also reflects on the role of digital visual creations in the information society and aims, not only as a space for critical analysis, but also as the place of exchange of experiences in different languages around the narrative and the creative processes generated in the new media.

Institutions and organizations such as UNESCO and the Ministry of Culture of Colombia have promoted and supported some calls for participation in the Monographic show of Media Art.

==== Academic forum ====
The academic forum is a space where teachers, students, professionals and researchers in history, theory and criticism in fields of design and creation, can participate by sharing paper and research works.

== History ==
This Festival has been held since 1997, conducted by the Department of Visual Design at the University of Caldas in Manizales, Colombia.
