= China International Gallery Exposition =

The China International Gallery Exposition (a.k.a. CIGE, Zhongguo guoji hualang bolanhui) is an annual art exhibition held in China which showcases modern art and design.

First held in April 2004 at the International Science and Technology Centre in Beijing, the CIGE had doubled in size by the following year and is now in its tenth iteration, which was held at the China National Convention Centre in April 2013. In 2007 a spin-off festival, Art Beijing, emerged as a separate event.
