= Moritz Stefaner =

German data visualization specialist

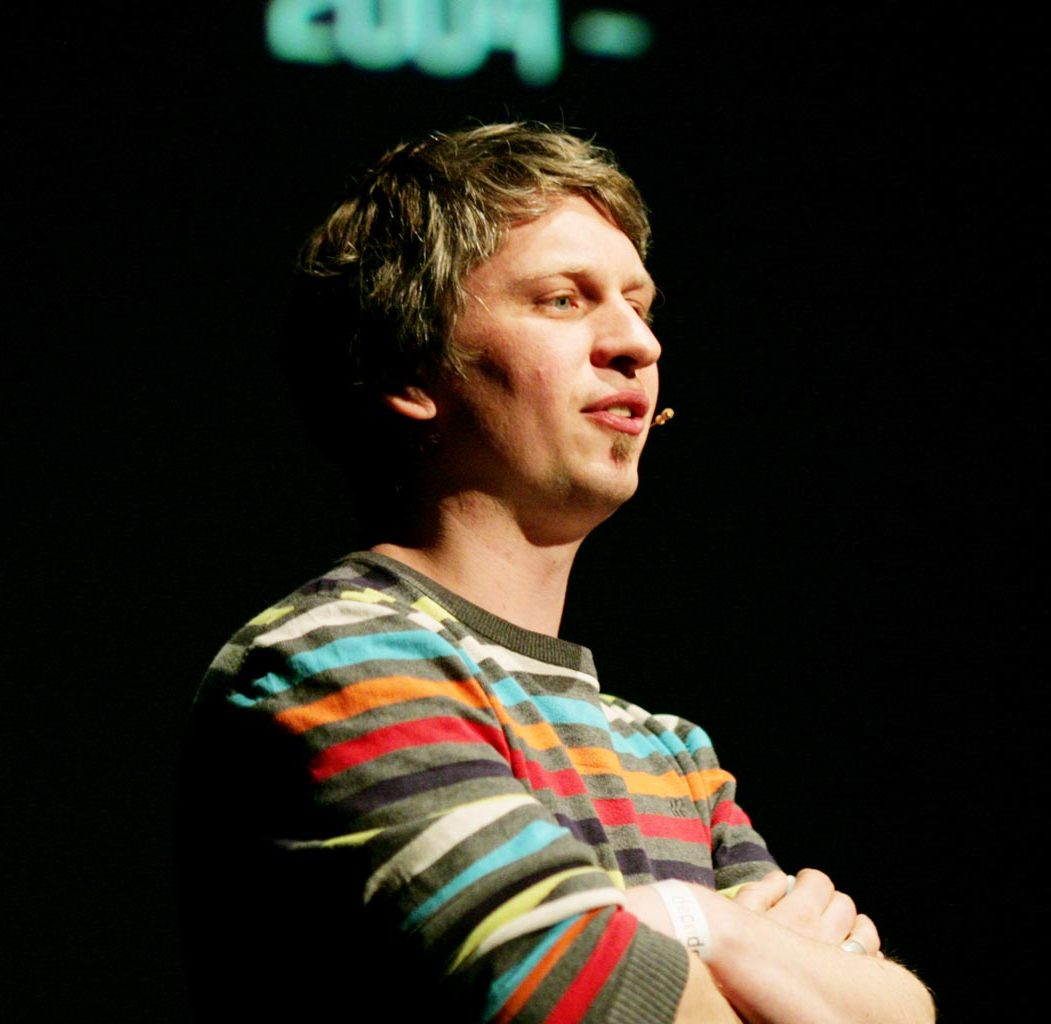
- Occupation: Designer

Moritz Stefaner is a German data visualization designer. He is notable for his work for organisations like the OECD, the World Economic Forum, Skype, dpa, and Max Planck Research Society. Stefaner is a multiple winner of the Kantar Information is Beautiful awards. His data visualisation work has been exhibited at Venice Biennale of Architecture and Ars Electronica. He has contributed to Beautiful Visualisation published by Springer and was interviewed for the books New Challenges for Data Design published by Springer and Alberto Cairo's The Functional Art.

One of Stefaner's most widely known works is the visualisation of the OECD Better Life Index. Among other notable projects is his interactive installation On Broadway, his work for the FIFA, and his design of the new OECD data portal.

Fast Company featured Stefaner's work for Deutsche Bahn, describing it as transformative and impactful for a $45 billion company. His work on Einstein Designer was featured in the German language book "Design und Künstliche Intelligenz", covering the relationship of design and artificial intelligence. HAS Magazine (A project by UNESCO-MOST) featured his data artwork MULTIPLICITY in an article. His work on the German COVID vaccination dashboard was widely recognized for its novel design and on-point execution. Lately, he has been working on the Climate—Conflict—Vulnerability Index, which has been launched by Federal Foreign Minister Annalena Baerbock at the BCSC 2024 conference.

With Enrico Bertini, he produced Data Stories, a podcast on data visualization from 2012 to 2023. Stefaner studied Cognitive Science (B.Sc., University of Osnabrück) and Interface Design (M.A., University of Applied Sciences Potsdam). He lives in Lilienthal, Germany.
