= Jeffrey Beers International =

Design and architecture firm

Jeffrey Beers International (JBI)
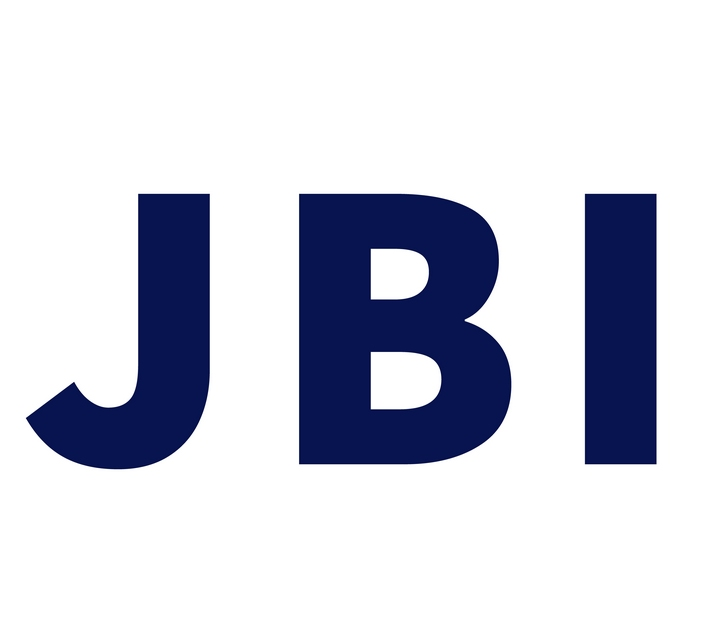
- Type: Private
- Industry: Interior Design
- Founded: 1986; 40 years ago in New York City, United States
- Headquarters: New York City, United States
- Area served: Worldwide
- Key people: Julia Choi, Jeffrey Ashey, Justin Beers, Tim Rooney, Michael Pandolfi, Nora Liu-Kanter
- Website: https://jeffreybeers.com/

Jeffrey Beers International (JBI) is a design studio with an extensive portfolio of projects spanning a variety of categories.

== Formation of JBI ==
JBI was founded by Jeffrey Beers in 1986, after he got I. M. Pei's blessing to do so. The goal of the company is to combine artistic and cultural knowledge, sophisticated urban sensibilities, and standout design skills. The result is a team consisting of architects, interior designers, painters, sculptors and graphic designers.

=== Leadership ===
After the death of Jeffrey Beers in March 2025, JBI announced its new representative partners: Tim Rooney, Michael Pandolfi and Nora Liu-Kanter. They each had been working for JBI for at least 20 years.

== Work ==
=== 2020s ===
Project name	Location	Operator	Date Completed
Atlantis The Royal, Dubai	UAE	Kerzner International	2023
Café Boulud	United States	Dinex Group	2023
Distrito T-Mobile	Puerto Rico	Government of Puerto Rico	2021
Estiatorio Milos Toronto	Canada	Spiliadis Restaurant Group	2024
Fontainebleau Las Vegas	United States	Fontainebleau Resorts	2023
Fontainebleau Miami Beach	United States	Fontainebleau Resorts	2024
Hard Rock Hotel New York	United States	Hard Rock International	2022
Intercontinental Times Square	United States	IHG Hotels & Resorts	2020
Omni Austin Hotel Downtown	United States	Omni Hotels & Resorts	2022
Omni Oklahoma City Hotel	United States	Omni Hotels & Resorts	2021
Omni PGA Frisco Resort & Spa	United States	Omni Hotels & Resorts	2023
Omni San Diego Hotel	United States	Omni Hotels & Resorts	2024
Paranza	Bahamas	Michael White (chef)	2023
Peter Luger Steak House Las Vegas	United States	Peter Luger Steak House	2023
Pier Sixty-Six	United States	Tavistock Group	2025
Rivers Casino Portsmouth	United States	Churchill Downs Inc.	2023
The Ritz-Carlton Dallas, Las Colinas	United States	The Ritz-Carlton Hotel Company	2024
The Ritz-Carlton Reynolds, Lake Oconee	United States	The Ritz-Carlton Hotel Company	2023
Roc Nation Headquarters	United States	Roc Nation	2020
Shinsegae Gangnam	South Korea	Shinsegae	2025
U.S. Bank Tower (Los Angeles)	United States	OUE Ltd.	2022

=== 2010s ===
Project name	Location	Operator	Date Completed
108 Leonard	United States	The Peebles Corporation	2022
277 Fifth Avenue	United States	Victor Group	2018
Atlantis Sanya	China	Kerzner International	2018
Ballpark Village (St. Louis)	United States	The Cordish Companies	2014
Capiz Lounge	United States	Marriott International	2019
Costa Smeralda (ship)	Italy	Costa Cruises	2018
Danlu	United States	Patrick Feury	2017
db Bistro Moderne	United States	Dinex Group	2013
db Bistro & Oyster Bar	Singapore	Dinex Group	2011
DB Brasserie	United States	Dinex Group	2014
DUNE by Jean-Georges	Bahamas	Jean-Georges Vongerichten	2017
Estiatorio Milos Bahamas	Bahamas	Spiliadis Restaurant Group	2015
Estiatorio Milos Las Vegas	United States	Spiliadis Restaurant Group	2010
Estiatorio Milos Miami Beach	United States	Spiliadis Restaurant Group	2013
The Fairmont Washington, D.C.	United States	Accor	2017
Fogo de Chão NY	United States	Rhone Capital	2014
Four Seasons Vail	United States	Four Seasons Hotels and Resorts	2019
Hard Rock Hotel & Casino Atlantic City	United States	Hard Rock International	2018
Hard Rock Hotel Riviera Maya	Mexico	Hard Rock International	2014
Hard Rock Hotel & Casino Punta Cana	Dominican Republic	Hard Rock International	2011
Hell's Kitchen (restaurant)	United States	Gordon Ramsay North America Division	2018
Japonais by Morimoto	United States	Mirai Sushi Group	2014
Live! at the Battery Atlanta	United States	The Cordish Companies	2017
The Ocean Club, A Four Seasons Resort	Bahamas	Four Seasons Hotels and Resorts	2016
One57	United States	Extell Development Company	2018
Pomme Palais and Villard Michel Richard at the Lotte New York Palace Hotel	United States	Northwood Investors	2013
Renaissance Hotel NY Midtown	United States	Renaissance Hotels	2015
Waterside (Norfolk, Virginia)	United States	The Cordish Companies	2017

=== Past Notable Projects ===
Project name	Location	Operator	Date Completed
China Grill	United States	China Grill Management	1987
China Grill Miami Beach	United States	China Grill Management	1996
Jiko at Disney's Animal Kingdom	United States	The Walt Disney Company	2006
Ed's Chowder House	United States	China Grill Management	2009
Fiamma Osteria	United States	Michael White (chef), Stephen Hanson	2002
Fontainebleau Miami Beach	United States	Fontainebleau Resorts	2008
Jet Nightclub	United States	The Mirage	2005
Japonais	United States	Mirai Sushi Restaurant Group	2003
Japonais at The Mirage	United States	Mirai Sushi Restaurant Group	2006
The Cove at Atlantis Paradise Island	United States	Kerzner International	2007
Porter House New York	United States	Michael Lomonaco	2006
Rumjungle	United States	China Grill Management	1999
Tabú Ultralounge	United States	MGM Resorts International	2003

=== Products ===
Jeffrey Beers International has been involved with various product design collaborations, most notably with a Walters Regatta patio furniture set and Maya Romanoff wallpapers titled "Burst of Happiness".

== Collaborators ==
- Gastón Acurio
- Michael White (chef)
- Gordon Ramsay
- Michael Lomonaco
- Guo Guangchang
- JAY-Z's Roc Nation
- Michel Richard
- Rafael Viñoly
- Daniel Boulud
- Costas Spiliadis

== Awards ==
- 2023 INT Interior Design Awards – Winner: US Bank Tower
- 2023 OPAL Awards, Interior Design, Restaurant, Bar, and Venue: Omni Austin Hotel Downtown won
- 2021 Interior Design (magazine) NYC x Design Awards, Roc Nation Headquarters Won for Best Creative Offices
- 2021 Outstanding Property Awards London, Roc Nation Headquarters Won for Best Office/Work Environment
- 2021 World Design Awards, WIN Awards, Roc Nation Headquarters Won for Best Office
- 2019 SBID Awards, Atlantis Sanya was a finalist in the Hotel Bedrooms & Suites category
- 2018 Restaurant Development + Design, Annual Awards: Gotham Market at the Ashland won the Best Limited-Service Restaurant Design award.
- 2017 Design et Al, The International Hotel & Property Awards: Renaissance NY Midtown won for Best Hotel Suite in The Americas
- 2016 Design Et Al (UK), The International Hotel & Property Awards: One&Only Ocean Club won for Best Suite and Best Hotel Under 200 Rooms in the Americas and Caribbean Category.
