= Ocean Club =

Ocean Club may refer to:

- Ocean Club (football club), a Gabonese football club based in Tchibanga, Gabon
- Ocean Club (Atlantic City), a condominium based in Atlantic City, New Jersey
- The Ocean Club, A Four Seasons Resort, Paradise Island, the Bahamas
