= List of presidential trips made by George W. Bush (2003) =

This is a list of presidential trips made by George W. Bush during 2003, the third year of his presidency as the 43rd president of the United States. International trips are highlighted in blue.

This list excludes trips made within Washington, D.C., the U.S. federal capital in which the White House, the official residence and principal workplace of the president, is located. It also excludes the capital's immediate surroundings in Maryland and Virginia, such as Andrews Air Force Base in Maryland, where the president typically boards Air Force One for all trips outside the area. Also excluded are trips to Camp David, the country residence of the president, and to the Bush family's Prairie Chapel Ranch near Crawford and Walker's Point Estate in Kennebunkport, Maine.

== January ==
State or country	Areas visited	Dates	Details
Texas	Killeen	January 3	Visited troops at Fort Hood.
Illinois	Chicago	January 7	Addressed the Economic Club of Chicago at the Sheraton Grand Chicago Riverwalk ballroom.
Pennsylvania	Scranton	January 16	Discussed the Medicare Prescription Drug, Improvement, and Modernization Act at the Regional Hospital of Scranton. Spoke at the University of Scranton Byron Recreation Center.
Missouri	St. Louis	January 22	Toured a local business, JS Logistics.
Michigan	Grand Rapids	January 29	Discussed Medicare policy at Spectrum Health Butterworth Hospital. Spoke at the DeVos Performance Hall.

== February ==
State or country	Areas visited	Dates	Details
Texas	Houston	February 4	Visited Johnson Space Center three days after the Space Shuttle Columbia disaster, meeting with family members of the deceased astronauts.
West Virginia	White Sulphur Springs	February 9	Spoke to the Congress of Tomorrow luncheon at The Greenbrier.
Tennessee	Nashville	February 10	Spoke with participants in the Campus for Human Development, a local recipient of support from the White House Office of Faith-Based and Community Initiatives. Addressed the National Religious Broadcasters Convention at the Gaylord Opryland Resort & Convention Center.
Florida	Jacksonville	February 13	Toured a local business, Dagher Printing. Met with sailors aboard the USS Philippine Sea at Naval Station Mayport.
Georgia	Marietta, Kennesaw	February 20	Spoke at Harrison High School.

== March ==
State or country	Areas visited	Dates	Details
Portugal	Terceira Island	March 16	Discussed the Iraq crisis with British prime minister Tony Blair, Spanish prime minister José María Aznar and Portuguese prime minister José Manuel Barroso.
Florida	Tampa	March 26	Briefed on the Iraq War at the United States Central Command Joint Intelligence Center at MacDill Air Force Base.
Pennsylvania	Philadelphia	March 31	Briefed on domestic security with Secretary of Homeland Security Tom Ridge at the Coast Guard Marine Safety Office at the Port of Philadelphia.

== April ==
State or country	Areas visited	Dates	Details
North Carolina	Jacksonville	April 3	Met with U.S. Marines and families of Marines killed in Iraq at Camp Lejeune.
United Kingdom	Belfast, Hillsborough	April 7–8	Met with Prime Minister Tony Blair to discuss the reconstruction of Iraq. Also met with Taoiseach Bertie Ahern and Northern Irish political leaders.
Missouri	Berkeley	April 16	Toured F-18 Super Hornet factory at Boeing Integrated Defense Systems headquarters.
Texas	Killeen	April 20	Spent Easter Sunday with troops at Fort Hood.
Ohio	Canton, Dayton, Lima	April 24	Toured Timken Company headquarters. Visited Wright-Patterson Air Force Base and the Lima Army Tank Plant.
Michigan	Dearborn	April 28	Discussed the Iraq War with Iraqi Americans at the Ford Community and Performing Arts Center. Met with the CEOs of the Big Three automakers.

== May ==
State or country	Areas visited	Dates	Details
California	Coronado, Santa Clara	May 1	Visited Naval Air Station North Island. Flew in a Lockheed S-3 Viking onto the USS Abraham Lincoln offshore, the first sitting president to arrive on an aircraft carrier in an arrested landing in a fixed-wing aircraft. Delivered the Mission Accomplished speech. Toured the United Defense Ground Systems Division facility.
Arkansas	Little Rock	May 5	Met with small business owners and employees at the Robinson Center.
South Carolina	Columbia	May 9	Gave the commencement address at the University of South Carolina at the Carolina Center.
New Mexico	Santa Fe, Bernalillo	May 9–12	Stayed at Roland Betts' vacation home. Visited a local Bernalillo business, MCT Industries.
Nebraska	Omaha	May 12	Toured a local business, Airlite Plastics, where he spoke about the Jobs and Growth Tax Relief Reconciliation Act of 2003.
Indiana	Indianapolis	May 12–13	Addressed the Indiana Republican Party at the Westin Hotel. Discussed his tax policy with senior citizens at the Indiana State Fairgrounds.
Missouri	Springfield, Pierce City	May 13	Toured damage from the Pierce City–Battlefield tornado.
Connecticut	New London	May 21	Gave the commencement address at the United States Coast Guard Academy.
Poland	Kraków, Oświęcim	May 31	Met with President Aleksander Kwaśniewski and Prime Minister Leszek Miller. Visited Nazi-German Auschwitz concentration camp.
Russia	St. Petersburg	May 31 – June 1	Met with President Vladimir Putin. Attended ceremonies commemorating the city's 300th anniversary.

== June ==
State or country	Areas visited	Dates	Details
France	Evian-les-Bains	June 1–2	Attended the 29th G8 summit. Met with Chinese president Hu Jintao.
Egypt	Sharm el-Sheikh	June 2–3	Attended the "Red Sea Summit" with the leaders of Bahrain, Egypt, Jordan and Saudi Arabia, and with Palestinian Authority Prime Minister Mahmoud Abbas.
Jordan	Aqaba	June 4	Attended meetings with Israeli prime minister Ariel Sharon and Palestinian prime minister Mahmoud Abbas. Met with King Abdullah II.
Qatar	Doha	June 4–5	Met with Emir Hamad bin Khalifa Al Thani. Visited U.S. Central Command headquarters and addressed U.S. military personnel, becoming the first U.S. president to visit the country.
Illinois	Chicago	June 11	Discussed Medicare policy in an address to the Illinois State Medical Society convention at the Hilton Chicago. Visited Grant Park.
Connecticut	New Britain	June 12	Discussed Medicare policy at New Britain General Hospital.
New Jersey	Orange, Elizabeth	June 16	Toured a local business, Andrea Foods. Spoke at the Grand Ballroom of the Wyndham Newark Airport Hotel.
Minnesota	Fridley	June 19	Toured a local business, Micro Control Company.
Georgia	Greensboro	June 20	Attended a Bush–Cheney campaign reception at The Ritz-Carlton Reynolds, Lake Oconee.
New York	New York	June 23	Attended a campaign luncheon at the Sheraton New York Times Square Hotel.
California	San Francisco, Los Angeles	June 27	Attended a campaign dinner at the San Francisco Airport Marriott and a dinner at the Century Plaza Hotel.
Florida	Miami, Tampa	June 30	Visited the Metropolitan Senior Center of the Little Havana Activities and Nutrition Centers. Attended campaign events at the Hilton Miami Airport and the Grand Hyatt Tampa Bay.

== July ==
State or country	Areas visited	Dates	Details
Ohio	Dayton	July 4	Celebrated Independence Day, and the centennial of the Wright brothers building the Wright Flyer in Dayton, at the National Museum of the United States Air Force.
Senegal	Dakar, Gorée Island	July 8	Met with President Abdoulaye Wade, with whom he toured the House of Slaves museum.
South Africa	Pretoria	July 8–11	Met with President Thabo Mbeki.
Botswana	Gaborone	July 10	Met with President Festus Mogae. Toured Mokolodi Nature Reserve.
Uganda	Kampala	July 11	Met with President Yoweri Museveni.
Nigeria	Abuja	July 11–12	Met with President Olusegun Obasanjo at Aso Villa. The President and Mrs. Bush also visited Abuja National Hospital and participated in a roundtable discussion with medical staff and beneficiaries of HIV/AIDS mother-to-child transmission prevention programs. The President and Mrs. Bush stayed overnight at Nicon Hilton Hotel.
Texas	Dallas	July 18	Spoke about the HealthierUS Initiative at the Lakewest Family YMCA. Attended a campaign reception at the Hilton Anatole.
Texas	Houston	July 19	Attended a campaign reception at the Westin Galleria.
Pennsylvania	Philadelphia	July 24	Spoke at the Financial Management Service regional center office.
Michigan	Livonia, Dearborn	July 24	Toured a local business, Beaver Aerospace and Defense. Attended a campaign reception at the Ritz-Carlton Dearborn.
Pennsylvania	Pittsburgh	July 28	Addressed the National Urban League Conference at the David L. Lawrence Convention Center.

== August ==
State or country	Areas visited	Dates	Details
Arizona	Tucson, Summerhaven	August 11	Toured damage from the Aspen Fire. Visited Coronado National Forest to speak about the Healthy Forests Initiative.
Colorado	Aurora, Denver	August 11	Announced the nomination of Utah governor Mike Leavitt as Administrator of the Environmental Protection Agency in a press conference at the Aurora Marriott. Attended a campaign reception at the Wings Over the Rockies Air and Space Museum.
California	Miramar, San Diego, Newport Beach, Thousand Oaks, Irvine	August 14–15	Visited military personnel at Marine Corps Air Station Miramar. Spoke to reporters about the ongoing Northeast blackout of 2003 while staying at the Manchester Grand Hyatt San Diego. Attended a campaign reception at the San Diego Convention Center. Toured the Santa Monica Mountains National Recreation Area. Attended a campaign luncheon at the Hyatt Regency Irvine.
Oregon	Portland, Redmond, Bend	August 21–22	Attended a campaign luncheon at the Chiles Center. Toured the area of the ongoing B&B Complex fires. Spoke at the Deschutes County Expo Center.
Washington	Burbank, Seattle	August 22	Toured the Ice Harbor Lock and Dam. Met with representatives of local businesses at Boeing Field.
Minnesota	St. Paul	August 26	Attended a campaign luncheon at the RiverCentre.
Missouri	St. Louis	August 26	Addressed the American Legion National Convention at America's Center.

== September ==
State or country	Areas visited	Dates	Details
Ohio	Cleveland, Richfield	September 1	Celebrated Labor Day at the International Union of Operating Engineers Local 18 Richfield Training Center.
Missouri	Kansas City	September 4	Spoke at the Kansas City Convention Center.
Indiana	Indianapolis	September 5	Toured a local business, the Langham Company. Attended a campaign reception at the Murat Centre.
Tennessee	Nashville	September 8	Visited Kirkpatrick Elementary School. Attended a campaign reception at the Loews Vanderbilt Plaza Hotel.
Florida	Jacksonville, Fort Lauderdale	September 9	Attended a campaign luncheon at the Alltel Stadium Touchdown Club. Visited Hyde Park Elementary School. Attended a campaign reception at the Hyatt Regency Pier Sixty-Six.
Georgia	Fort Stewart	September 12	Spoke to military personnel and their families at Trent Field.
Mississippi	Jackson	September 12	Campaigned for Haley Barbour in the 2003 Mississippi gubernatorial election at the Mississippi Coliseum.
Texas	Houston	September 12	Spoke with Kirbyjon Caldwell at the Power Center.
Michigan	Monroe	September 15	Toured a Detroit Edison power plant.
Pennsylvania	Drexel Hill	September 15	Attended a campaign reception at Drexelbrook Catering and Banquet Facility.
Virginia	Richmond	September 22	Toured the Temporary Virginia Emergency Operations Center at the Virginia State Police Academy, in the wake of Hurricane Isabel.
New York	New York	September 23–24	Stayed at the Waldorf-Astoria Hotel. Attended the opening of the 58th United Nations General Assembly.
Illinois	Chicago	September 30	Attended a campaign reception at the Sheraton Chicago Hotel and Towers. Spoke with business leaders at the University of Chicago Graduate School of Business.
Ohio	Cincinnati	September 30	

== October ==
State or country	Areas visited	Dates	Details
Wisconsin	Milwaukee	October 3	Spoke at the Midwest Airlines Center. Attended a campaign luncheon at the Italian Community Center.
New Hampshire	Portsmouth, Manchester	October 9	Spoke at Pease Air National Guard Base. Addressed the Greater Manchester Chamber of Commerce at the New Hampshire Holiday Inn-Center of New Hampshire.
Kentucky	Lexington	October 9	Campaigned for Ernie Fletcher in the 2003 Kentucky gubernatorial election at the Lexington Convention Center.
California	Dinuba, Fresno, Riverside, San Bernardino	October 16	Toured Ruiz Foods headquarters. Attended campaign receptions at the Fresno Convention Center and the Riverside Convention Center. Spoke at the San Bernardino Radisson Hotel with Governor-elect Arnold Schwarzenegger.
Japan	Tokyo	October 17–18	Met with Prime Minister Junichiro Koizumi. In the evening, President and Mrs. Bush attended a dinner hosted by the Prime Minister at Akasaka Palace. The President and Mrs. Bush stayed overnight at the U.S. Ambassador's residence.
Philippines	Manila	October 18	Addressed a joint session of the Philippine Congress and met with President Gloria Macapagal Arroyo. Attended a state dinner in their honor at Malacanang Palace.
Thailand	Bangkok	October 18–21	Attended the APEC Summit Meeting, staying at the Grand Hyatt Erawan Bangkok. Met with Prime Minister Thaksin Chinnawat of Thailand and President Hu Jintao of China. Attended a state dinner hosted by King Phumiphon Adunyadet and Queen Sirikit at the Grand Palace. Met with President Roh Moo-hyun of South Korea and President Vicente Fox of Mexico. Attended a gala dinner and closing ceremonies at the Royal Thai Navy Convention Hall.
Singapore	Singapore	October 21–22	Met with Prime Minister Goh Chok Tong. In the evening, the President met with President Sellapan Rama Nathan and his wife Urmila Nandey at The Istana. The President and Mrs. Bush stayed overnight at the Shangri-La Hotel during their visit.
Indonesia	Denpasar	October 22	Met with President Megawati Sukarnoputri and Muslim religious leaders during a brief stopover at the Patra Bali Airport Resort and Villa adjacent to Bali Airport.
Australia	Canberra	October 22–23	Met with Prime Minister John Howard. Addressed joint meeting of Parliament.
Hawaii	Honolulu	October 23	Toured Hickam Air Force Base, the USS Arizona Memorial, and the USS Missouri. Visited a second-grade classroom at Pearl Harbor Elementary School. Attended a Hawaii Republican Party reception at the Kahala Mandarin Oriental. Addressed the 7th Pacific Islands Conference of Leaders at the East–West Center.
Texas	Dallas	October 29	Spoke at the dedication of the Oak Cliff Bible Fellowship Youth Education Center.
Ohio	Columbus	October 30	Attended a campaign luncheon at the Hyatt Regency Columbus. Toured a local business, Central Aluminum Company.
Texas	San Antonio	October 30	Attended a campaign reception at the Marriott Rivercenter.

== November ==
State or country	Areas visited	Dates	Details
Mississippi	Southaven	November 1	Campaigned for Haley Barbour at the DeSoto Civic Center.
Kentucky	Paducah, London	November 1	Campaigned for Ernie Fletcher at Barkley Regional Airport and London-Corbin Airport.
Mississippi	Gulfport	November 1	Campaigned for Haley Barbour at Jones Park.
Alabama	Birmingham	November 3	Toured a local business, CraneWorks. Attended a campaign luncheon at the Sheraton Birmingham Hotel.
California	Miramar, San Diego, Harbison Canyon, El Cajon	November 4	Visited Marine Corps Air Station Miramar. Toured damage from the Cedar Fire, then met with local fire chiefs at Gillespie Field.
North Carolina	Winston-Salem	November 7	Attended a campaign luncheon at the M.C. Benton Jr. Convention Center. Toured Forsyth Technical Community College.
Arkansas	Little Rock	November 10	Attended a campaign luncheon at the Statehouse Convention Center.
South Carolina	Greer, Greenville	November 10	Toured the BMW Spartanburg plant. Attended a campaign reception at the Palmetto Expo Center.
Florida	Orlando, Fort Myers	November 13	Attended a campaign reception at Disney's Grand Floridian Resort & Spa. Spoke at the Engelwood Neighborhood Center in Orlando.
United Kingdom	London, Sedgefield	November 18–21	Main article: State visit by George W. Bush to the United Kingdom State Visit. Met with Queen Elizabeth II and Prime Minister Tony Blair.
Colorado	Colorado Springs	November 24	Met with servicemembers and families of servicemembers who died in Iraq at Peterson Air Force Base and Fort Carson.
Nevada	Las Vegas	November 25	Discussed Medicare reform at Spring Valley Hospital. Attended a campaign luncheon at The Venetian Las Vegas.
Arizona	Phoenix	November 25	Discussed Medicare reform at Los Olivos Senior Center. Attended a campaign reception at the Arizona Biltmore Hotel.
Iraq	Baghdad	November 27	The President travelled in secret from his ranch in Texas to Andrews Air Force Base, where reporters were told not to use their devices or leak news of the trip, and then to Iraq. Met with members of the Coalition Provisional Authority and the Iraqi Governing Council, becoming the first U.S. president to visit the country. Addressed U.S. military personnel.

== December ==
State or country	Areas visited	Dates	Details
Michigan	Detroit, Dearborn, Canton	December 1	Attended a campaign luncheon at the Hyatt Regency Dearborn. Toured a local Canton business, Dynamic Metal Treating, Inc.
New Jersey	Newark, Whippany	December 1	Spoke at the Hanover Marriott in Whippany.
Pennsylvania	Pittsburgh	December 2	Attended a campaign luncheon at the Westin Convention Center Hotel.
Maryland	Baltimore, Halethorpe	December 5	Attended a campaign luncheon at the Hyatt Regency Baltimore. Visited a Home Depot store in Halethorpe.
North Carolina	Kill Devil Hills	December 17	Attended the Centennial of Flight ceremony, the 100th anniversary of the first successful powered heavier-than-air flight, at the Wright Brothers National Memorial.
