= Db Bistro & Oyster Bar =

Defunct seafood restaurant in Singapore

db Bistro & Oyster Bar
- Interactive map of db Bistro & Oyster Bar

Restaurant information
- Established: January 2011; 15 years ago
- Food type: Seafood
- Location: 2 Bayfront Avenue, Marina Bay, Singapore, 018935, Singapore
- Coordinates: 1°17′1.307″N 103°51′38.601″E

db Bistro & Oyster Bar was a restaurant located at Marina Bay Sands (MBS) in Singapore. Founded by Daniel Boulud as a spinoff of his db Bistro Moderne in New York City, it specialized in fresh seafood more due to Singapore's coastal location. The restaurant featured a bar area where guests could try a variety of cocktails and other drinks. The bar also featured live music on certain nights.

In 2024, the restaurant was closed and replaced by a new restaurant from Boulud, Maison Boulud.

== History ==
The restaurant was closed in January 2024 to be replaced by a new restaurant, Maison Boulud, also by Boulud, to be opened at MBS also. Some of the dishes from Db Bistro & Oyster Bar were also served at Maison Boulud.

== Layout ==
The interior was modeled after a traditional French bistro with dark wood, red leather booths and marble tabletops. The multi-level dining room had a window with a view into the kitchen, and the private dining room had a view into the wine cellar. The interior was designed by Jeffrey Beers International.

== Staff ==
The executive chefs were Stephane Istel from 2010 to 2013 and Jonathan Kinsella from 2013 to 2024.
