= The Light of Seven Matchsticks =

Defunct cocktail bar in Worthington, Ohio, U.S.

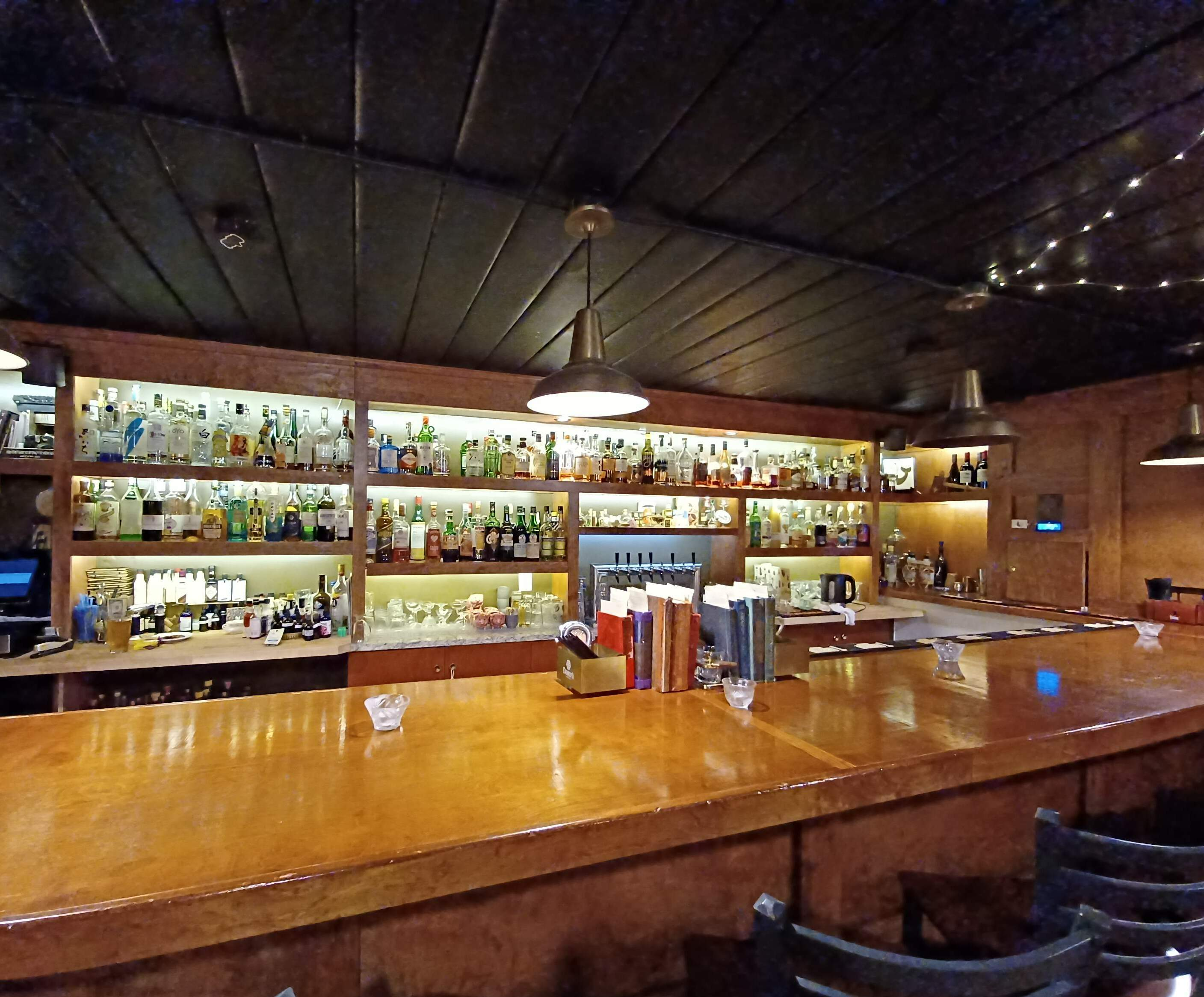
- Interactive map of The Light of Seven Matchsticks

Restaurant information
- Established: January 19, 2017
- Closed: September 18, 2022
- Owners: Natalie and Charlie Jackson
- Managers: P.J. Ford, Kileen Lehman
- Location: 5601 N. High Street, Worthington, Ohio
- Coordinates: 40.076682°N 83.019354°W

The Light of Seven Matchsticks was a craft cocktail bar in Worthington, Ohio. The bar was designed with a speakeasy style and literary elements, especially relating to Wes Anderson films. It was located beneath Natalie's Coal-Fired Pizza and Live Music, an independent restaurant and music venue. The Light of Seven Matchsticks opened in January 2017 and closed on September 18, 2022.

The bar was considered one of the best in the Columbus area. In 2022, Mashed listed it as the best bar in Ohio. It was regarded for its decor and atmosphere, inventive cocktails, and food menu.

== Attributes ==
The Light of Seven Matchsticks was named for a fictitious book featured in the Wes Anderson film Moonrise Kingdom. The 1,000-square-foot (93 m^{2}) bar was hidden beneath Natalie's Coal-Fired Pizza and Live Music, a music venue and restaurant with 2,400 square feet (220 m^{2}). There was no visible street-level signage for the bar.

The space had a heavy ambiance, with Wes Anderson-inspired decor, tall green velvet booths, wood trim, menus hidden in old library books, and secret menus in checkout-card slots at the backs of the books. Originally, the bar played music of the early 1900s, and had a varying menu of French, Thai, Indian, or other cuisines. Its operating hours began every night with 1920s jazz standard The Charleston. By 2019, its food staples were duck fat popcorn with Grana Padano, housemade jerky, Korean barbecue pork ribs, Singapore noodles, and Sicilian meatballs. The bar had no cell service, considered a feature of the space.

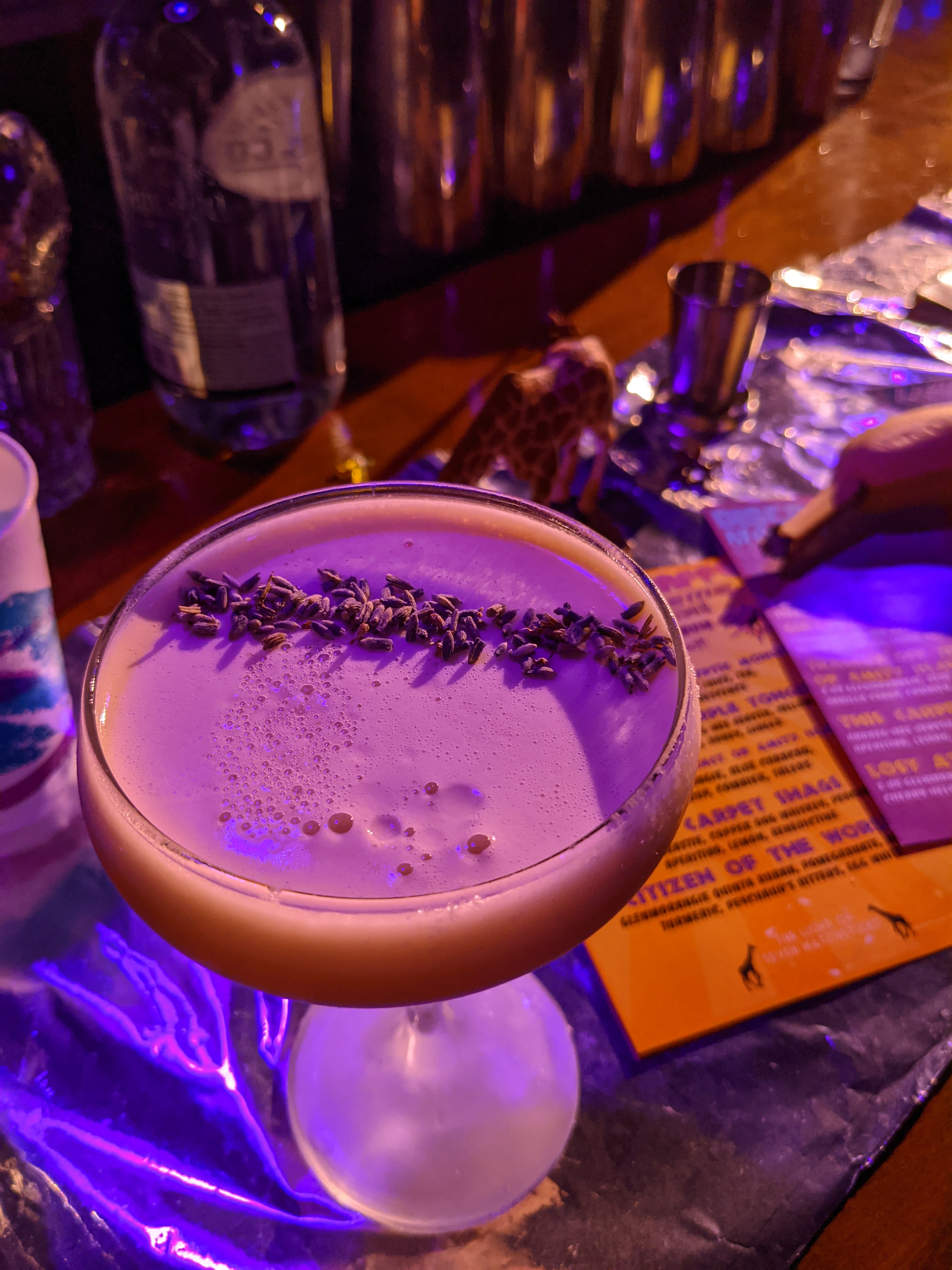
A cocktail served in the bar

The bar also had a waiting area by the entrance, separate from the rest of the space. A dividing wall between the two had a grated mail slot and sliding door, allowing guests to place orders before seating.

The bar's cocktail menu was divided in chapters titled after Joseph Campbell's concept of the hero's journey. Originally, "Call to Adventure" included drinks with rarer ingredients, "Profound Dream State" included reworked classic cocktails, and "Meet the Mentor" had adjusted recipes devised by leading bartenders around the United States. As of 2019, the bar had 30 cocktails on its menu, all reasonably priced.

The bar was considered one of the best in Columbus. Readers of Columbus Underground consistently rated the bar one of the best in the city. In 2022, Mashed listed it as the best bar in Ohio.

== History ==
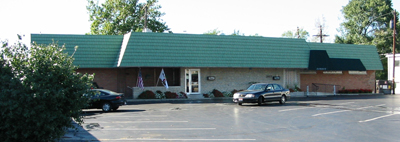
Restaurant building in 2004, before renovation

The bar space or the restaurant above had previously housed about six other businesses. The building was constructed in 1958 for Ann Ton's Restaurant, which opened at the same address in 1945. The new restaurant, run by Tony and Ann Fracasso, served Italian and American foods, and had a private party room, a rathskeller, and a lounge. The restaurant, kitchen, and bar was originally outfitted by the Wasserstrom Company. At one time, the bar there reportedly drew in Perry Como and Dean Martin. The business was sold in 1970 and the space was converted for Peacock Kitchen or Peacock China Grill. The building later housed Bangkok Cuisine, followed by Guido's La Cucina Italiana. Guido's opened in 1996.

In February 2001, 30 people were arrested at the restaurant, including 10 Columbus firefighters. The people were arrested following a tip to police that illegal gambling was taking place at the restaurant. In March, 42 people were charged with gambling, including the restaurant's owner and assistant manager. Many of the bettors and operators pleaded guilty in their trials. In 2001, an Italian eatery called Fratello's Restaurant opened in the space. Its operator and part-owner, Nancy Moretti, was the daughter of Ann and Tony Fracasso. The business abruptly closed in February 2003.

Natalie's Coal-Fired Pizza and Live Music opened in the building in 2012; the business was owned by Charlie Jackson and his daughter Natalie Jackson. For five years the business was not actively using its basement space, which already had a bar; it was used for storage and as a green room for performers. Staff members collaborated on the idea to open a speakeasy-style bar. The Light of Seven Matchsticks opened on January 26, 2017, following a soft opening on January 19. It was originally managed by Kileen Lehman.

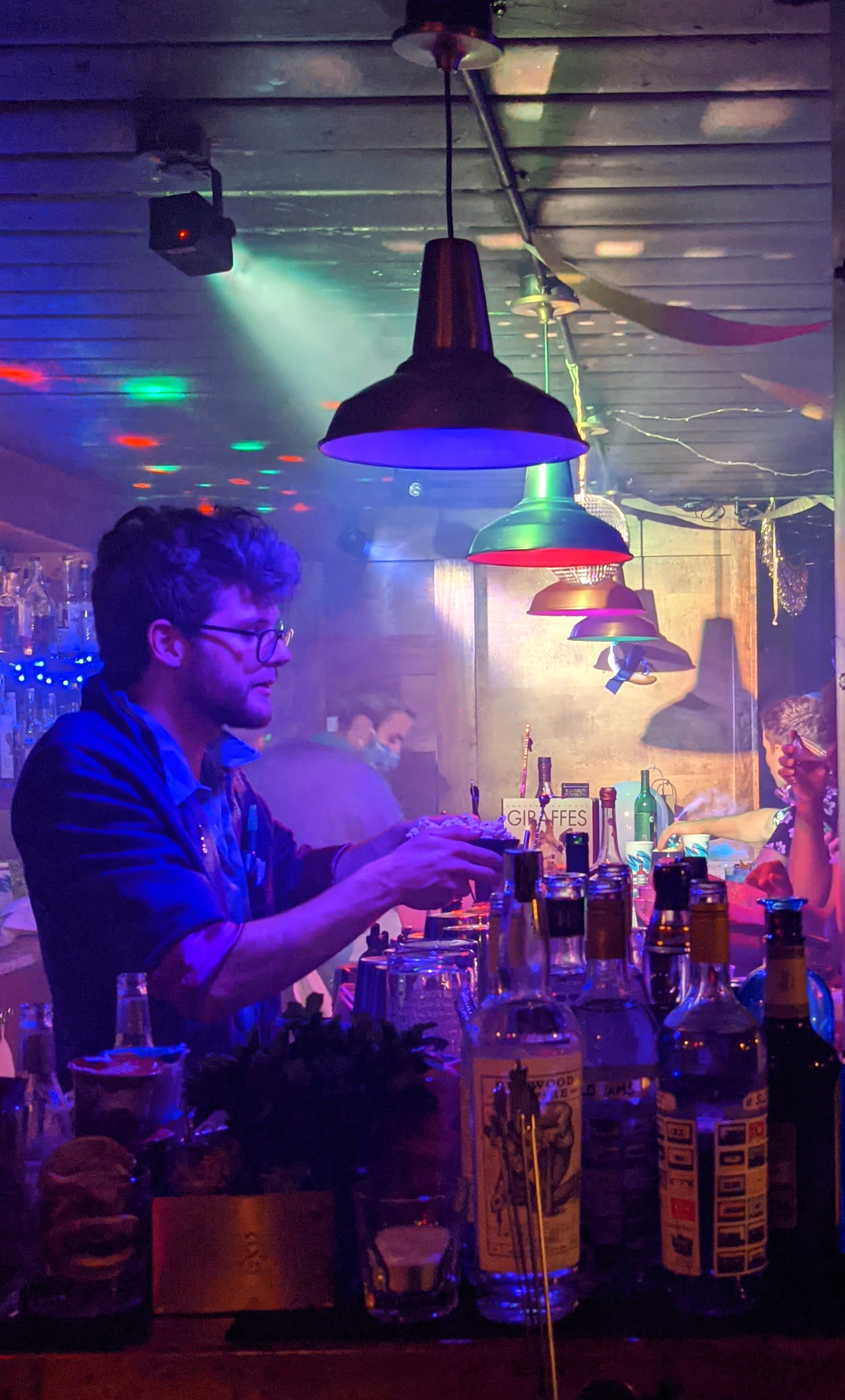
An event in the bar, 2021

From around 2018 into the 2020s, the bar was managed by P.J. Ford, who created a frequently changing menu with inventive ingredients. He was highlighted as one of nine Columbus-area "tastemakers" by Columbus Monthly for his work at the bar. He introduced non-alcoholic cocktails to the bar in summer 2019, including "Al Green Tea": olive oil-washed sundew green tea, lemon juice, orange marmalade syrup, cardamom bitters, and egg white, served in a coupe glass.

The bar was positively reviewed in a Columbus Monthly feature in 2019. The magazine wrote that "the establishment blends sophistication, whimsy and a love of literature in a manner that can seem a little precious, but is a lot of fun." At this time, the bar was popular enough that a two-hour limit was imposed for guests at tables.

During the COVID-19 pandemic, Natalie's began a policy to require proof of a negative COVID-19 test or a COVID-19 vaccine. The policy applied to both Natalie's locations as well as the Light of Seven Matchsticks. The Worthington locations saw protesters outside in mid-August, denouncing the vaccine mandate.

In September 2022, the owners of the bar and upstairs restaurant announced the closure of both spaces; the bar closed on September 18 of that year. The bar's general manager, P.J. Ford, became general manager of another craft cocktail bar in the area, Law Bird. The businesses were put up for sale; its owners stated the sale was made in order to pool resources into the larger Natalie's location in Grandview, another Columbus suburb. There the business owners hope to create a new bar concept with the hope to draw similar guests. The bar will continue to hold private events until the sale takes place.

In July 2023, the bar's staff announced they would host a single-night popup at the Bottle Shop, a similarly quirky bar in Columbus. The popup event on July 24, 2023, is to include foods and drinks formerly on the Light of Seven Matchsticks' menu in addition to new creations, listed on menus hidden in antique books as the bar once used.
