= Fiamma Osteria =

Defunct restaurant in New York City, U.S.

- Interactive map of Fiamma Osteria

Restaurant information
- Established: 2002
- Closed: 2009
- Location: 206 Spring Street, New York City, New York, 10012, United States
- Coordinates: 40°43′31.1″N 74°0′13.5″W

Fiamma Osteria (later known as simply Fiamma) was a restaurant in New York City. The restaurant had received a Michelin star in 2006, 2007 and 2009. The interior was designed by Jeffrey Beers International.

== Staff ==
Fiamma Osteria was Founded by Michael White and Stephen Hanson. Michael White served as the first executive chef and co-owner from 2002 to 2006. He departed due to ongoing disagreements about the restaurant's direction. He was succeeded by Christian Fantoni (2006–2007) and Fabio Trabocchi (2007–2009).

== Closure ==
After closing in January 2009, Fiamma briefly operated as an event space until its sale to Corigin Real Estate Group in November 2012. The decision to close was influenced by the 2008 financial crisis and the restaurant's location, which proved to be somewhat disconnected from both the heart of SoHo and the more suitable neighborhood of Tribeca, which might have been a better fit for its high-end offerings.

== See also ==
- List of defunct restaurants of the United States
- List of Michelin-starred restaurants in New York City
