= China Grill Miami Beach =

Defunct Restaurant in Miami

- Interactive map of China Grill Miami Beach

Restaurant information
- Established: 1996; 30 years ago
- Closed: 2012
- Location: 404 Washington Avenue, Miami Beach, Miami-Dade County, United States
- Coordinates: 25°46′26.254″N 80°8′4.621″W
- Seating capacity: 390

China Grill Miami Beach opened in 1996 and was Jeffrey Chodorow’s second property under his China Grill Management company. It was located at 404 Washington Avenue in the South Beach neighborhood of Miami Beach. The dining room interior was designed by Jeffrey Beers International.

== Staff ==
The first Executive Chef of China Grill Miami beach was Maria Manso from 1996 until 2000. Following her departure, Christian Plotczyk became the Executive Chef, and stayed in that position until 2004. From 2005 to 2008 Sean Sheldon Muhammad was the General Manager and Executive Chef, and from 2007 to 2010 Tim Nickey was the Executive Chef.

== Closing, Relocation and Reopening ==
The original location closed in 2012. It was set to be renamed China Grill Miami and relocated to 801 Brickell Avenue in the Brickell neighborhood. The relocation eventually happened in 2015 but it was named Komodo rather than China Grill Miami. China Grill Miami Beach will be reopening by 2027 at Bal Harbour Shops of North Beach.
