= Red Square (restaurant) =

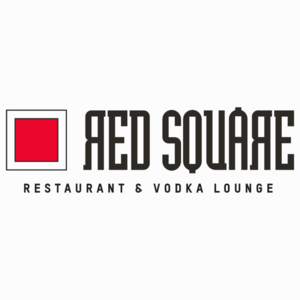

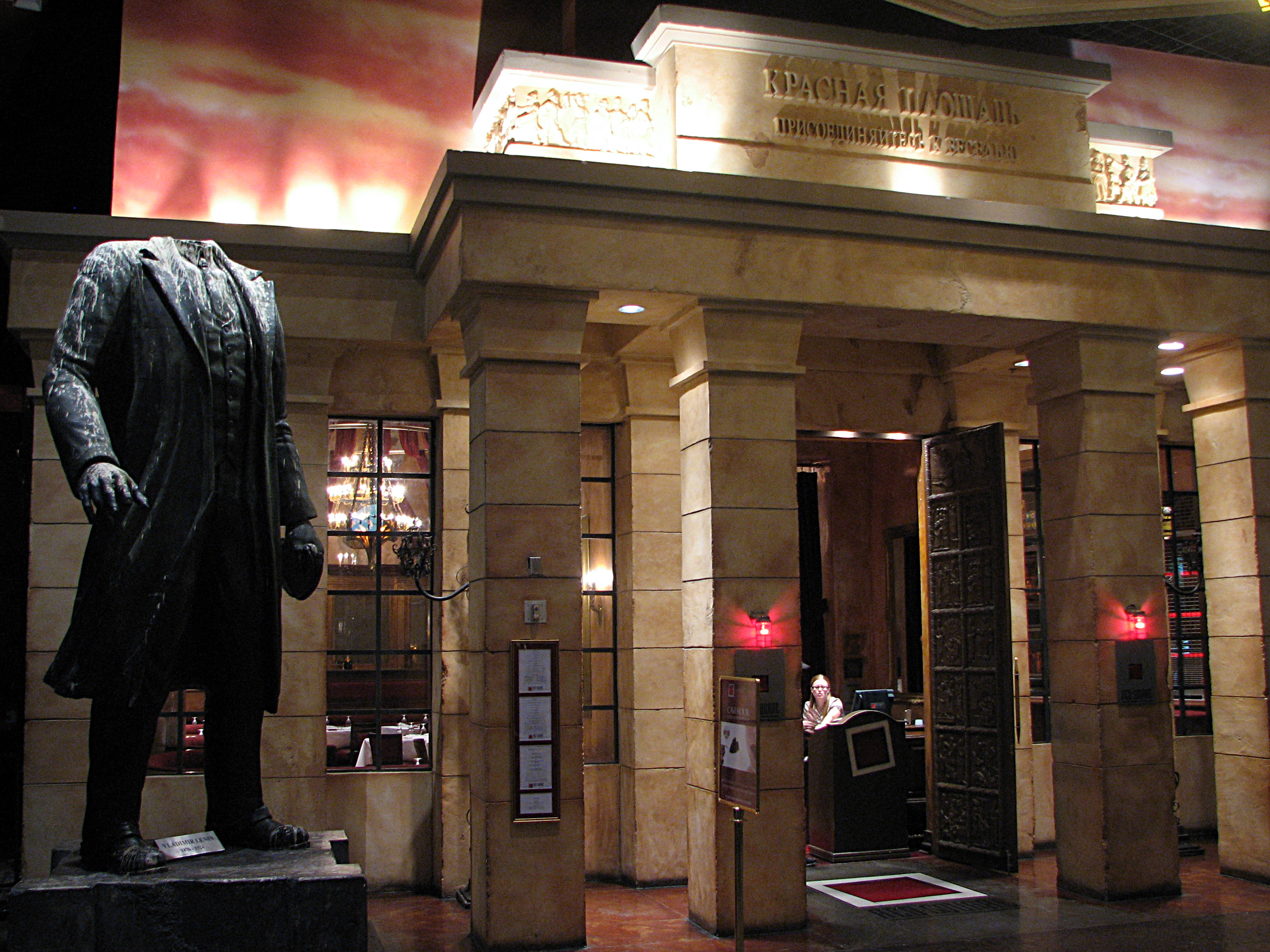
- Entrance to Red Square

- Location within Las Vegas Strip Location within Nevada Location within the United States

Restaurant information
- Established: 1999
- Closed: November 17, 2019
- Previous owners: SBE and Disruptive Restaurant Group
- Head chef: Chris Conlon
- Food type: American cuisine Eastern European cuisine
- Dress code: Casual
- Location: 3950 S Las Vegas Blvd, Las Vegas, Clark County, Nevada, 89119, United States
- Coordinates: 36°05′31.9″N 115°10′36″W
- Reservations: Suggested

Red Square was a Russian-themed restaurant and bar located in the Mandalay Bay Resort in Las Vegas, Nevada and at the Tropicana Atlantic City in Atlantic City, New Jersey. The Atlantic City location closed in 2012, followed by the Las Vegas restaurant closing in November 2019, after twenty years of service.

== History ==
=== Las Vegas location ===
Red Square opened at Mandalay Bay Resort in Las Vegas, Nevada in 1999. The restaurant was operated by The Light Group and Brian Massie served as executive chef. In February 2019, Disruptive Restaurant Group took over management. The Las Vegas location closed in November 2019. This restaurant was not opened by The Light Group it was sold to them by China Grill Management but opened by China Grill Management Executive Chef Frank Copestick

=== Atlantic City location ===
Red Square opened in Atlantic City at the Tropicana in 2007. The Atlantic City location closed in 2012.

== Design ==
The Red Square restaurants were two of the only depictions of Soviet culture in the United States. Both locations included statues of Lenin out front of the entrance, both covered with fake pigeon feces. After numerous complaints at the Las Vegas location of the statue's depiction of Lenin, resort management cut the head off the statue and displayed it inside the bar. At the Las Vegas location, the statue head of Lenin is displayed in the middle of the bar's vodka vault, cut off from the statue out front of the restaurant.

The bars were dark with stark architecture and wooden walkways connecting fine dining rooms. The main dining room design was inspired by Czarist palaces. The bar chandeliers were copies of those at the Embassy of Poland in Moscow. The interior was painted red and gold and propaganda-style art decorated the walls.

== Cuisine and beverages ==
=== Cuisine ===
Red Square served American-Eastern European fusion cuisine. Signature menu items included flights of caviar and Siberian Nachos (smoked salmon, wasabi cream, chives, and tobiko topped wonton chips). The restaurant menu also included steak tartare, pierogi, chicken Kiev, pelmeni and short rib Stroganoff. They also offered caviar tastings.

=== Beverages ===
The bar served over 200 brands of vodka from over 20 countries. The bar offered vodkas infused in house. The bar featured a vodka vault, housing hundreds of vodka in a refrigerated environment. Guests could pay premium prices to drink inside the vault, wearing fur coats and hats provided by the restaurant.

A signature drink at Red Square was a Moscow Mule made with Jean-Marc XO Vodka.

== Reception ==
10best.com described Red Square Las Vegas as having "one of the city's coolest bars." Vegas Legal called the bar an "incredible time piece."

== Gallery ==
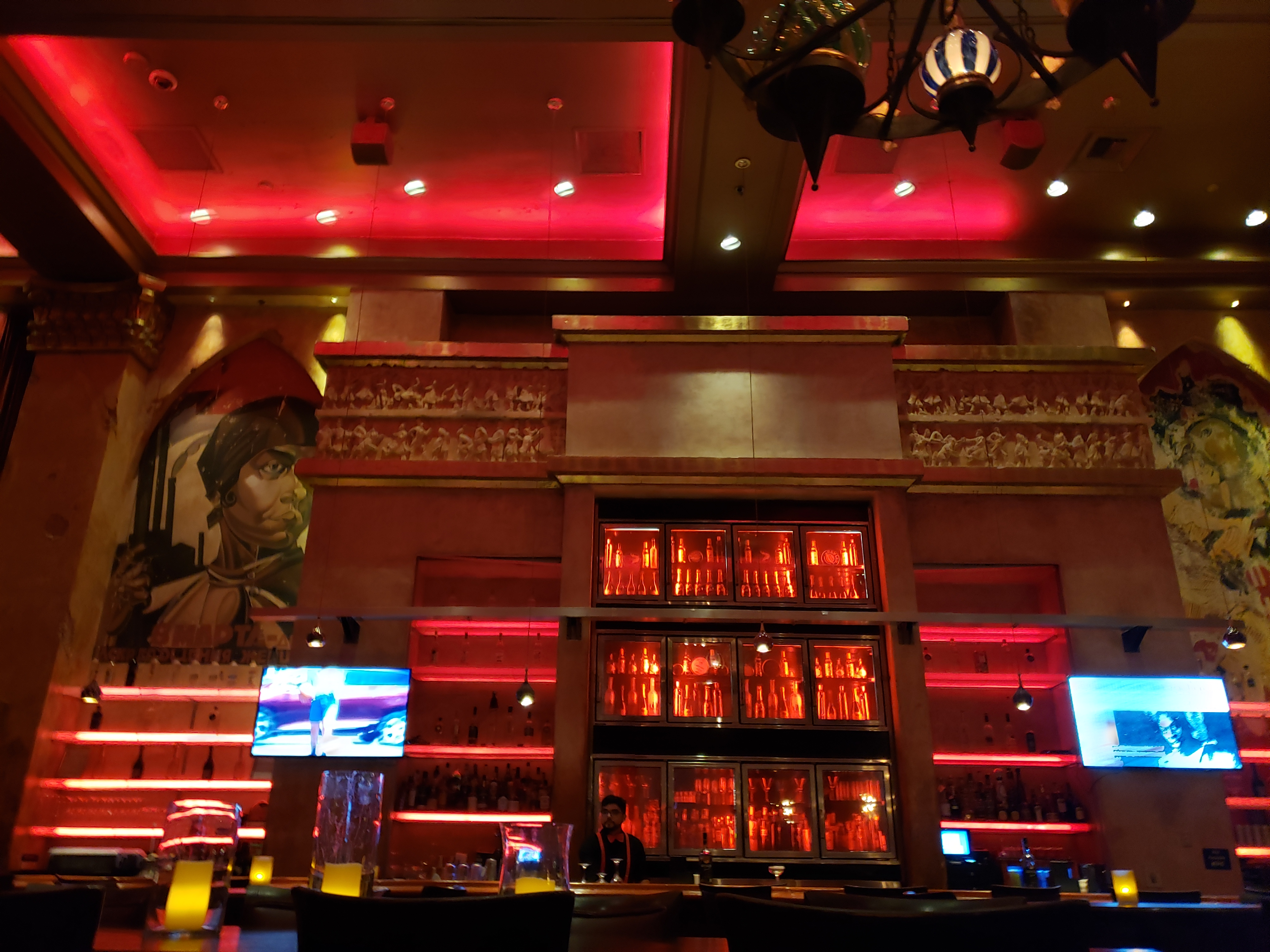
Bar

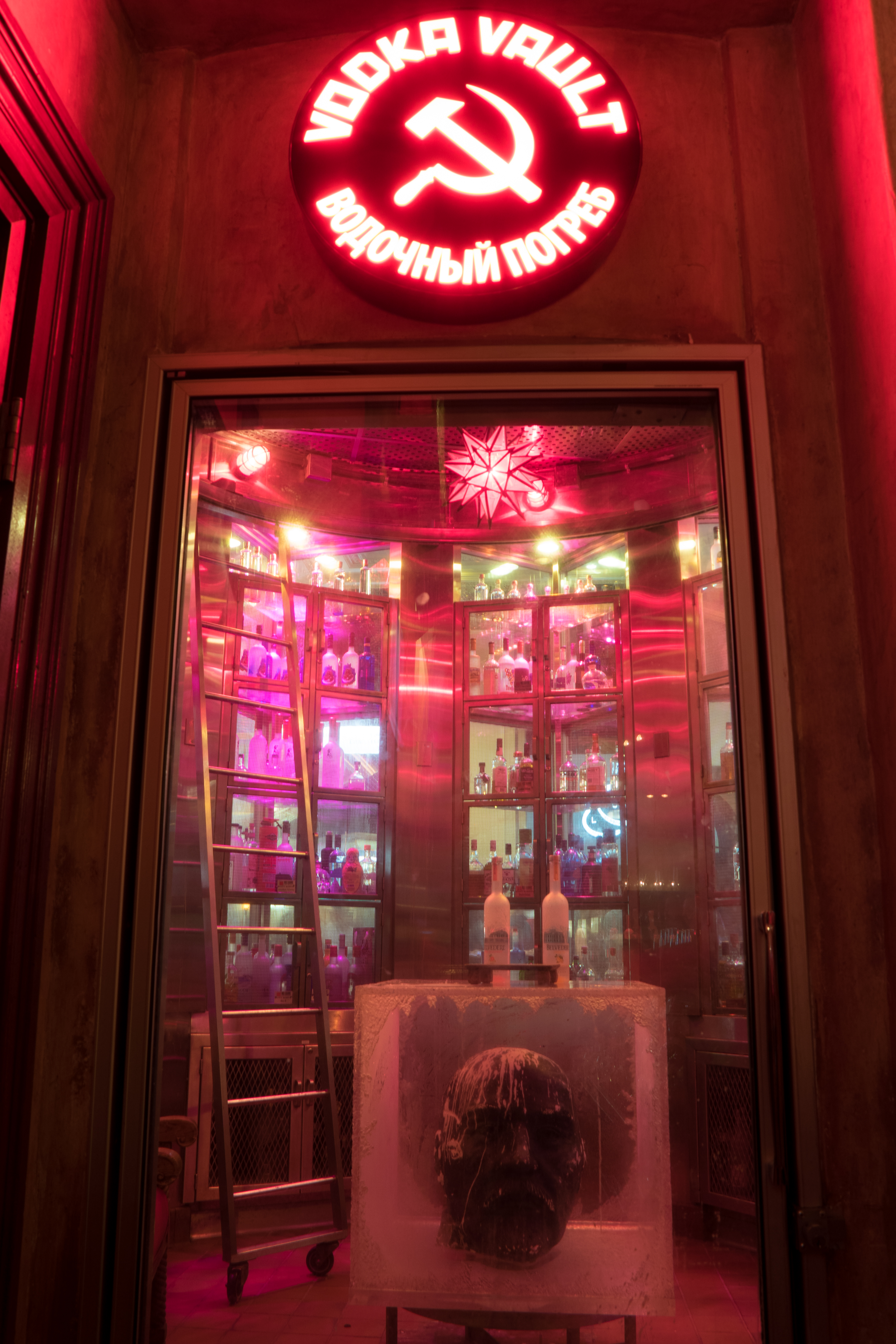
Vodka Vault with Lenin's frozen statue head

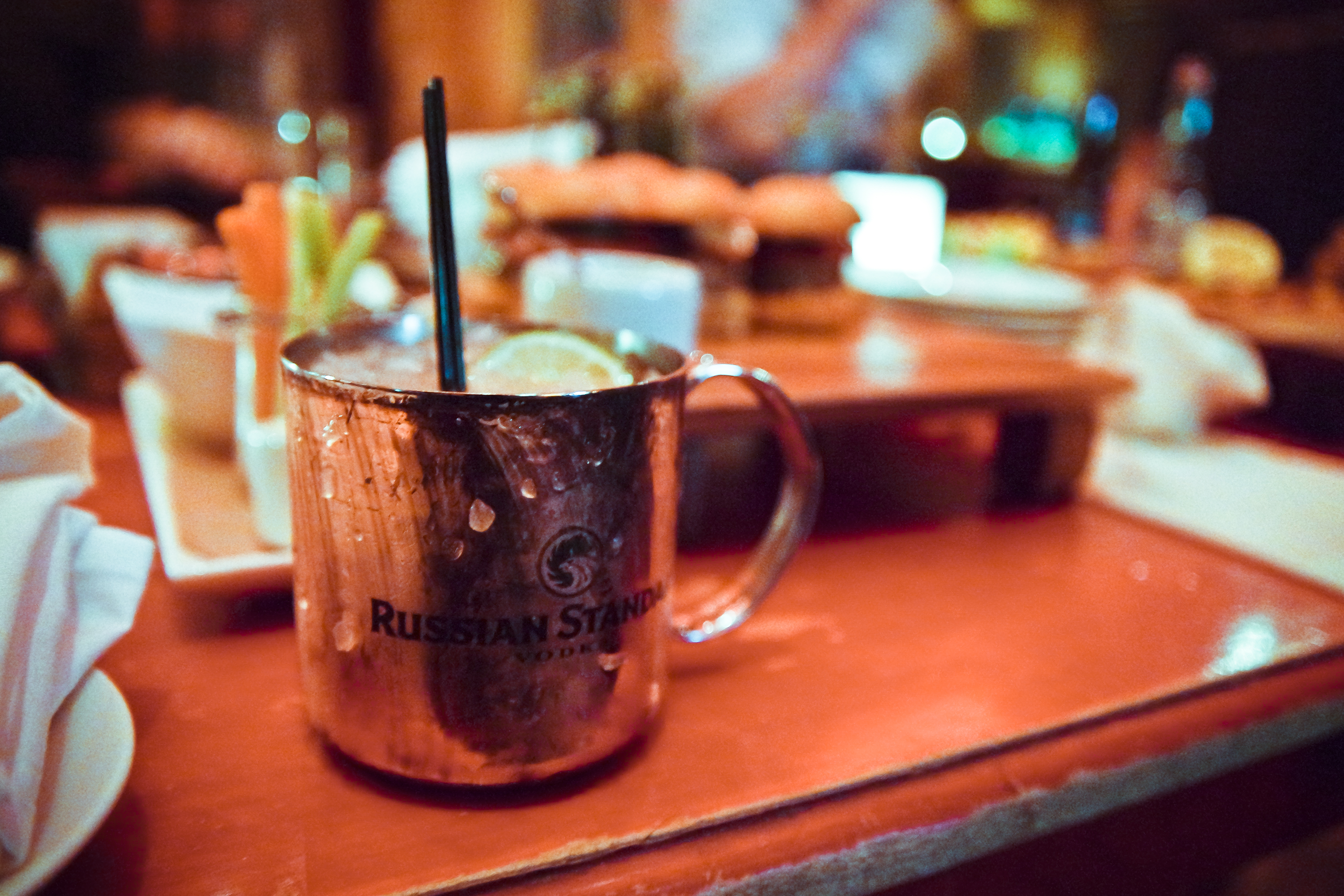
Moscow mule

== See also ==
- List of restaurants in the Las Vegas Valley
- List of Russian restaurants
- List of statues of Vladimir Lenin
