= Morimoto =

Morimoto (written: 森本 lit. "(one who lives) near the forest") is a Japanese surname. Notable people with the surname include:

- Akemi Morimoto (森本 朱美, born 1968), Japanese cyclist
- Carlos Morimoto, Brazilian software engineer and author
- Kana Morimoto (森本 佳奈, born 1992), Japanese kickboxer
- Keita Morimoto (森本 啓太, born 1990), Japanese artist
- Kōji Morimoto (森本 晃司, born 1959), Japanese animator and anime director
- Kozueko Morimoto (森本 梢子), Japanese manga author
- Leon Morimoto (born 2001), American-born Guamanian professional footballer
- Mamoru Morimoto (森本 葵, 1939–2021), Japanese middle distance runner
- Masaharu Morimoto (森本 正治, born 1955), Japanese chef
- Pedro Ken Morimoto (born 1987), Brazilian former footballer
- Ryōji Morimoto (森本 亮治, born 1982), Japanese actor
- Shigeki Morimoto (森本 茂樹, born 1967), Japanese video game designer and programmer
- Shintaro Morimoto (森本 慎太郎, born 1997), Japanese singer and actor, member of boy band SixTONES
- Takayuki Morimoto (森本 貴幸, born 1988), Japanese professional footballer
- Tomo Morimoto (森本 友, born 1983), Japanese long distance runner
- Tsuru Morimoto (森本 鶴, born 1970), Japanese former footballer
