= Michael White (chef) =

American chef

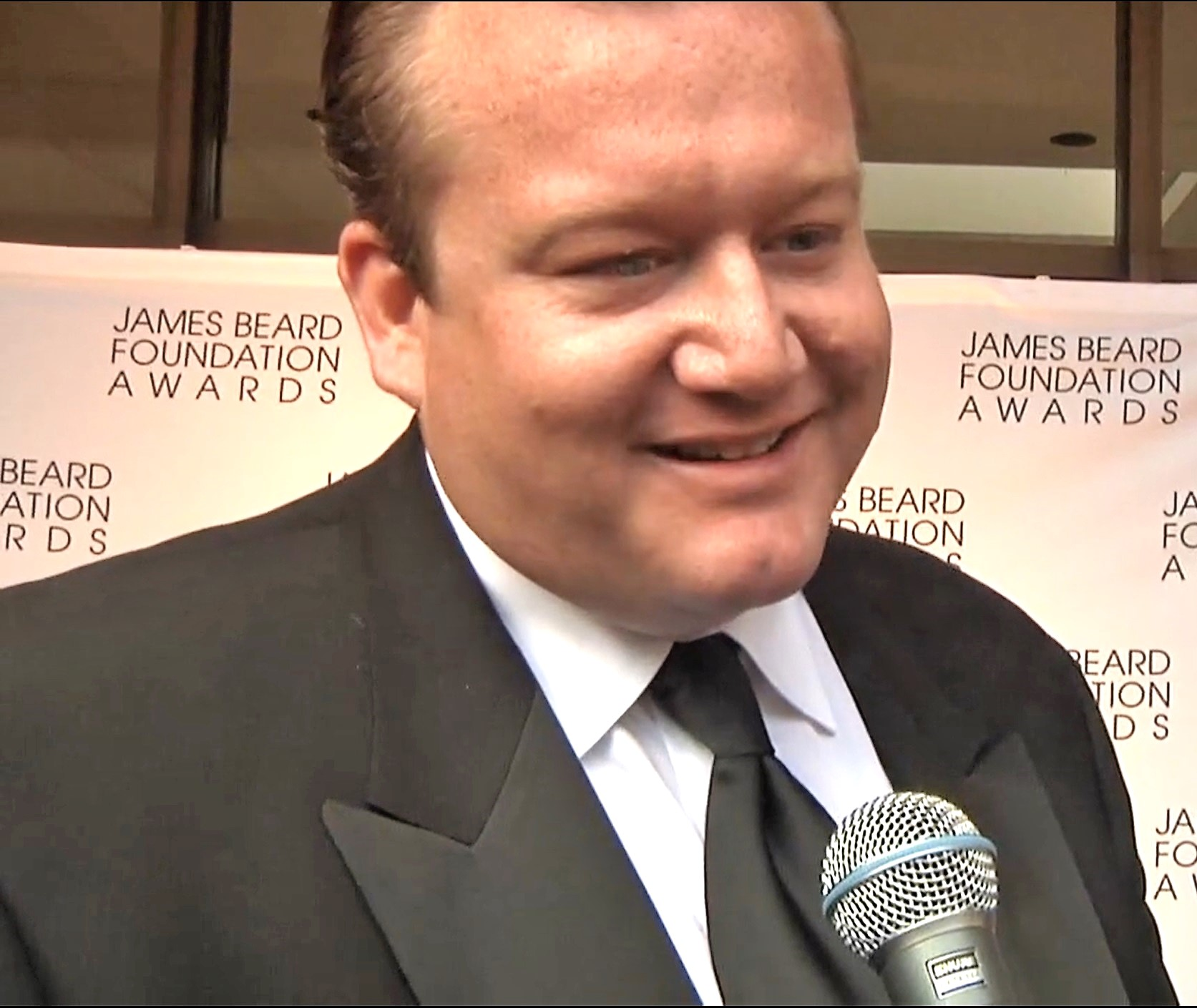
- White interviewed at the James Beard Foundation Awards 2010
- Born: Michael John White; Beloit, Wisconsin
- Education: Kendall Culinary Institute
- Spouse: Giovanna White
- Children: Francesca White
- Culinary career
- Cooking style: Italian
- Rating
- Michelin stars
- Current restaurants
- MIKA; Santi; Paranza; Lions Den
- Previous restaurants
- Fiamma Osteria; Alto; Convivio; Marea; Osteria Morini; Osteria Morini NJ; Ai Fiori; Al Molo; Nicoletta; Costata; Due Mari; Vaucluse

Michael White is the former Head Chef and Owner of the Altamarea Group, which is composed of the restaurants Marea, Ai Fiori, Vaucluse, Osteria Morini, Nicoletta, Costata, and The Butterfly in New York, Osteria Morini and Due Mari in New Jersey, and Al Molo in Hong Kong. Marea earned two Michelin stars (in 2019 it was downgraded to a single star) and is a member of the prestigious Relais and Chateaux. Ai Fiori has also earned a Michelin star.

In 2021, White left his positions with the Altamarea Group, after decamping permanently to his country home in the Hamptons during the COVID-19 pandemic.

In 2024, White opened his first standalone restaurant in Miami, MIKA, located at The Plaza Coral Gables.

In 2026, White opened an Italian restaurant at the newly renovated Stoneleigh hotel in Dallas called Lions Den.

== Career ==
Michael White spent his childhood in Beloit, Wisconsin before enrolling in Kendall Culinary Institute in 1989. Following Kendall, he spent seven years training in Italy at Ristorante San Domenico in Imola, Italy under the culinary guidance of chef Valentino Marcattilii, while receiving additional training in Paris and the South of France.

In 2002, he became Executive Chef of Fiamma Osteria, which has since closed, but received several accolades including a Michelin star. In 2006, White published a cookbook entitled Fiamma: The Essence of Contemporary Italian Cooking.

In 2007, White partnered with Ahmass Fakahany to open Due Terre and later Due Mari in New Jersey, both of which also went on to receive awards. He then took control of L'Impero and Alto in Midtown Manhattan, the former of which was rebranded as Convivo; both later received Michelin stars.

In 2023, White opened Paranza at Atlantis Paradise Island resort in Paradise Island, Bahamas. He named it after the Italian translation of Small Fishing Boat and considered Paranza the most important opening in his culinary career since opening Marea in New York. It is one of three standalone Michelin chef experiences at Atlantis.

=== Additional restaurants with which White has been affiliated ===
- In September 2008, Ahmass Fakahany and Michael White opened their second New Jersey restaurant called Due Mari in New Brunswick.
- In May 2009, Fakahany and White opened Marea, which received numerous accolades including two Michelin stars in the 2012 Guide (downgraded to one star in 2019) and three stars from The New York Times.
- In October 2010, Fakahany and White opened the first Osteria Morini in downtown Manhattan, an Italian restaurant focusing on cuisine from Emilia-Romagna. Two subsequent branches opened in Bernardsville, NJ and Washington DC in 2012 and 2013, respectively.
- In November 2010, White opened Ai Fiori, a Mediterranean restaurant, at The Langham; the venture received one Michelin Star and three stars from The New York Times.
- In May 2011, White and the Altamarea Group opened Al Molo in Victoria Harbor, Hong Kong.
- Nicoletta Pizzeria opened in New York's East Village in June 2012; later branches opened next to Osteria Morini in Bernardsville in 2015 and in the King of Prussia Mall outside Philadelphia in 2016.
- White and Altamarea opened a steakhouse named Costata in Manhattan's SoHo neighborhood in 2013, which later closed; Altamarea currently uses its brand for a steak delivery service.
- Chop Shop was another steakhouse, located in London's Theatre District; it opened in September 2013 and subsequently closed.
- In December 2013, the Altamarea Group opened a pan-Italian restaurant, Ristorante Morini, on Manhattan's Upper East Side; a franchise with the same name was opened that same year in Istanbul's Zorlu Center mall.
- In September 2015, the Altamarea Group opened its first French restaurant, Vaucluse, on the Upper East Side, which later permanently closed in 2020.

== See also ==
- List of Michelin starred restaurants
