= Jet Nightclub =

Defunct Nightclub in Las Vegas

- Interactive map of Jet Nightclub
- Address: 3400 S Las Vegas Blvd. Las Vegas; United States
- Coordinates: 36°7′16.4604″N 115°10′27.0156″W

Construction
- Opened: December 30, 2005; 20 years ago
- Closed: September 6, 2011

Jet was a nightclub located at The Mirage on Las Vegas Boulevard from 2005 to 2011.

== History ==
Construction finished in August 2005 with an interior designed by Jeffrey Beers International. Jet hosted a grand opening on December 30, 2005, featuring a red-carpet event attended by celebrities, including Enrique Iglesias, Ethan Suplee, Lance Bass, Jaleel White, Elizabeth Banks, and Paris Hilton. Kid Rock hosted the venue's inaugural New Year’s Eve party the following evening.

In 2008 Jet was ranked as the 5th highest revenue out of every nightclub in the United States, bringing in 35-50 million dollars.

Jet officially closed its doors on September 6, 2011, but its legacy continued with a rebranding to 1OAK Las Vegas.
