= China Grill Management =

Restaurant group

- Industry: Restaurant group
- Founded: 1987
- Website: chinagrillmgt.com

China Grill Management is a restaurant group which owns and operates over 22 restaurants worldwide under 15 concepts worldwide. Headquartered in Florida, the group now has locations in Miami, Los Angeles, Las Vegas, Ft. Lauderdale, Chicago, Atlantic City, London and Mexico City. China Grill Management was established in 1987 by Jeffrey Chodorow. The first location was China Grill in Midtown West Manhattan. All restaurants are located in major cities, many of which are in hotels. The most notable concepts are Asia de Cuba and China Grill.

== Restaurants & bars ==
=== Asia de Cuba ===
Asian-Latin cuisine

- London: at St. Martins Lane
- Miami: at Mondrian South Beach
- Los Angeles, California: at Mondrian Los Angeles; Designed by Philippe Starck

=== China Grill ===
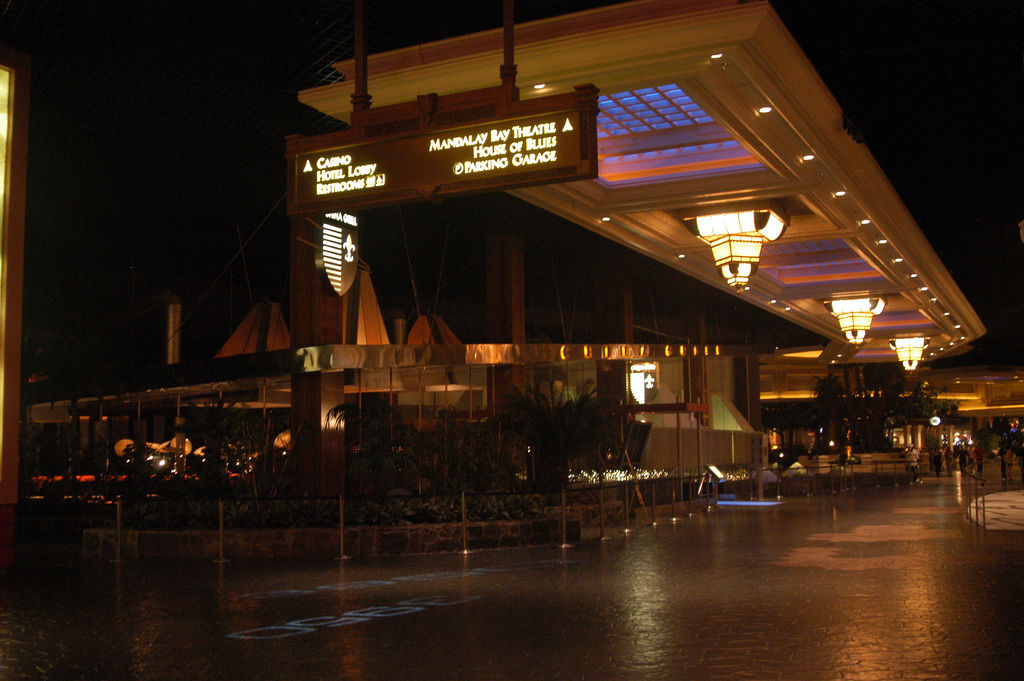
China Grill in Las Vegas

Asian-inspired World Cuisine

- Chicago: at The Hard Rock Hotel Chicago (within the Carbide & Carbon Building)
- Ft. Lauderdale
- Las Vegas: at Mandalay Bay Hotel
- Miami: China Grill Miami Beach
- Mexico City: at Camino Real Hotel; Also features the Moonbar
- New York City: Midtown West, Manhattan (at the CBS Building); CGM's first location; Closed 2017.

=== Red Square ===
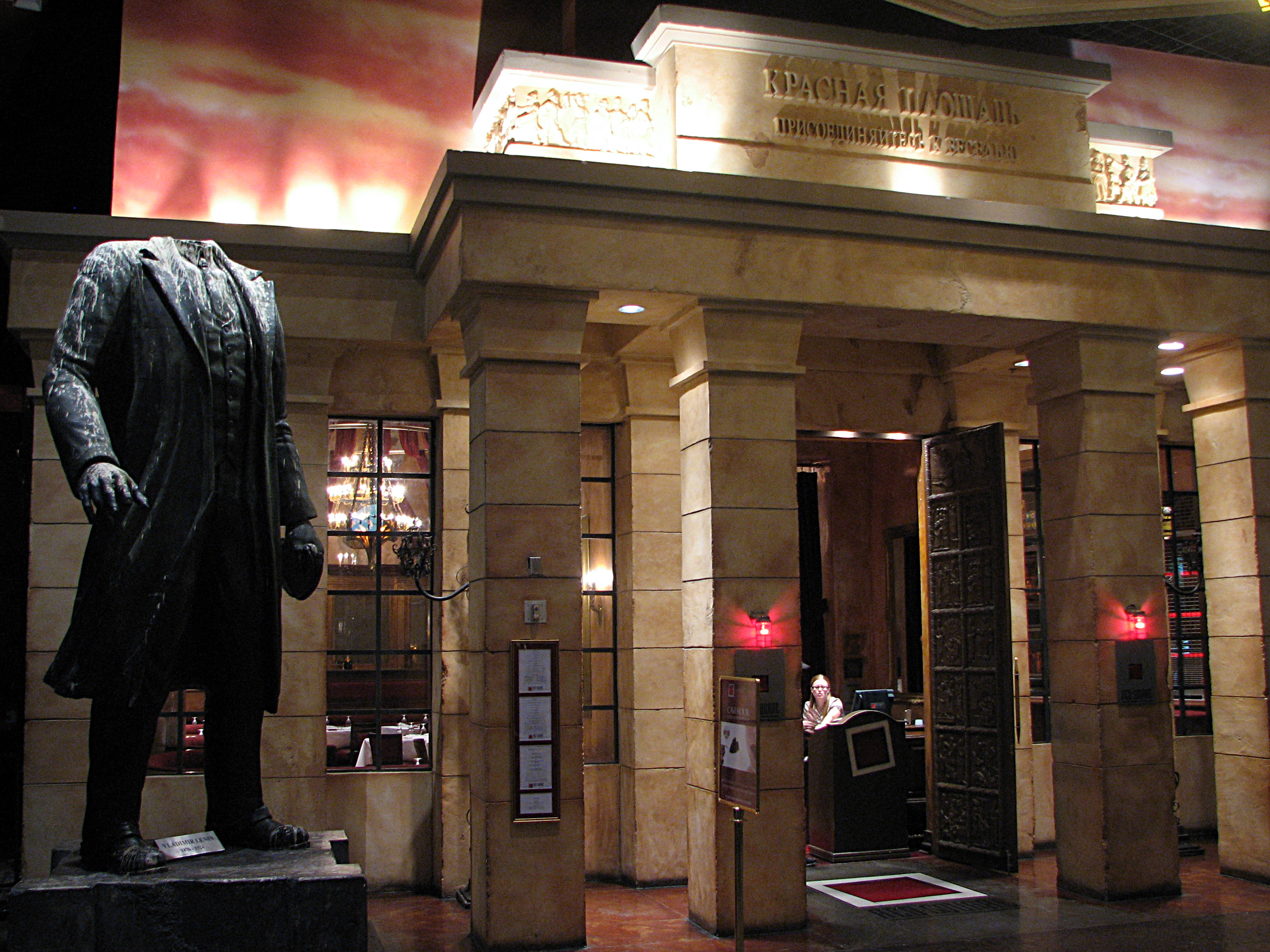
Red Square in Las Vegas

International cuisine with a Russian Flair

- Las Vegas: at Mandalay Bay Hotel

=== Other restaurants ===
- London
  - Light Bar at St Martins Lane: Philippe Starck design
  - Purple Bar & Long Bar at Sanderson: Philippe Starck design
  - Suka: at the Sanderson Hotel; Modern Malaysian cuisine
- Miami
  - Biscayne Tavern
- New York City
  - Ed's Chowder House: at The Empire Hotel; East Coast Seafood cuisine
  - plunge Rooftop Bar + Lounge: at Gansevoort Meatpacking
  - The Empire Hotel Rooftop: at The Empire Hotel
  - East & West at YOTEL New York

== Awards and accolades ==
- Asia de Cuba LA: Zagat Best LA Décor Restaurants
- Asia de Cuba LA: Zagat Best Los Angeles Caribbean/Cuban Restaurants
- Asia de Cuba Miami: Miami New Times Best Restaurant for Cocktails 2009
- Bar Basque: New York Magazine Where to Eat 2011
- Bar Basque: 2011 Zagat Survey Best New York City Hot Spots
- Blue Door Fish: 2011 Miami New Times Best Seafood on the Beach
- China Grill New York: Zagat Survey Best New York City Power Lunch Restaurants
- China Grill New York: Zagat Survey Best New York City Asian Restaurants
- China Grill Miami Beach: Zagat Survey Best Pan-Asian Restaurants
- Ed's Chowder House: New York Magazine Where to Eat 2010
- The Empire Hotel Rooftop: Travel and Leisure The Hottest Hotel Rooftop Bars 2009
- Plunge: ABC News World's Best Rooftop Bars 2010
