= Japonais =

Defunct Fusion restaurant in Chicago

- Interactive map of Japonais

Restaurant information
- Established: September 17, 2003; 22 years ago
- Food type: Fusion
- Location: 600 West Chicago Avenue, Chicago, Cook County, Illinois, 60610, United States
- Coordinates: 41°53′48.379″N 87°38′36.548″W

Japonais, later known as Japonais by Morimoto, opened in 2003 under the Mirai Sushi Restaurant Group. They offered French-Japanese fusion cuisine and was located at 600 W. Chicago Avenue in the River North neighborhood of Chicago. For eight years, the restaurant was led by Chef Gene Kato, who became a key figure there. In 2011, Chef Kato left to start Sumi Robata Bar.

== Rebrand/Renovations ==
After Chef Kato's departure, Iron Chef Masaharu Morimoto took over the lease and rebranded the restaurant as Japonais by Morimoto. The restaurant underwent a seven-week renovation in 2013 and reopened on February 5, 2014. Both the renovation and the original interior design were done by Jeffrey Beers International.

Morimoto was involved in the rebranding process, making public appearances, including throwing the first pitch at a Chicago White Sox game in August 2013, and hosting a charity event on reopening day.

== Closure ==
Japonais Chicago closed its doors on October 16, 2015, following disagreements with its management company.
