= Db Bistro Moderne =

Defunct French restaurant in New York

db Bistro Moderne
- Interactive map of db Bistro Moderne

Restaurant information
- Established: 2001; 25 years ago
- Closed: 2020
- Food type: French
- Location: 55 W. 44th Street, New York City, 10036, United States
- Coordinates: 40°45′21.361″N 73°58′55.609″W

db Bistro Moderne New York City was opened in 2001 by Daniel Boulud, closed temporarily August 11, 2013 and reopened on September 21st, 2013 following renovations done by Jeffrey Beers International. It was connected to the City Club Hotel at 55 W 44th street and offered American French Fusion dishes. Their most popular offering was the db Burger, which was stuffed with truffles, short rib and foie gras. They were known for a prix-fixe menu option. Reservations were required.

== Staff ==
Their Executive chefs were Laurent Kalkatour (2010–2013), James Burke (2013), Brian Loiacono (2013–2015), and Michael Balboni (2019–2021). Prior to 2010 they only had executive sous chefs.

== Closing ==
Db Bistro Moderne closed permanently in 2020 after closing temporarily for the pandemic.
