= Ocean Club (football club) =

- Full name: Ocean Club FC
- Ground: Stade Dialogue, Tchibanga, Gabon
- Capacity: 1,000
- League: Gabon Championnat National D1
- 2013–14: 14th (Relegated)

Ocean Club is a Gabonese football club based in Tchibanga, Gabon.

The club currently plays in Gabon Championnat National D1.

== Stadium ==
Currently the team plays at the 1,000 capacity Stade Dialogue.

== League participations ==
- Gabon Championnat National D1: 2013–
- Gabon Second Division: ????–2013
