= The Ocean Club, A Four Seasons Resort =

Resort located on Paradise Island in the Bahamas

- Interactive map of The Ocean Club, A Four Seasons Resort
- Location: Paradise Island, Bahamas; One Ocean Drive, Nassau, New Providence; 25°4′43.971″N 77°18′14.647″W
- No. of rooms: 100
- Notable restaurants: DUNE by Jean-Georges
- Owner: Four Seasons Hotels and Resorts
- Architect: SB Architects
- Previous names: The Ocean Club
- Website: https://www.fourseasons.com/oceanclub/

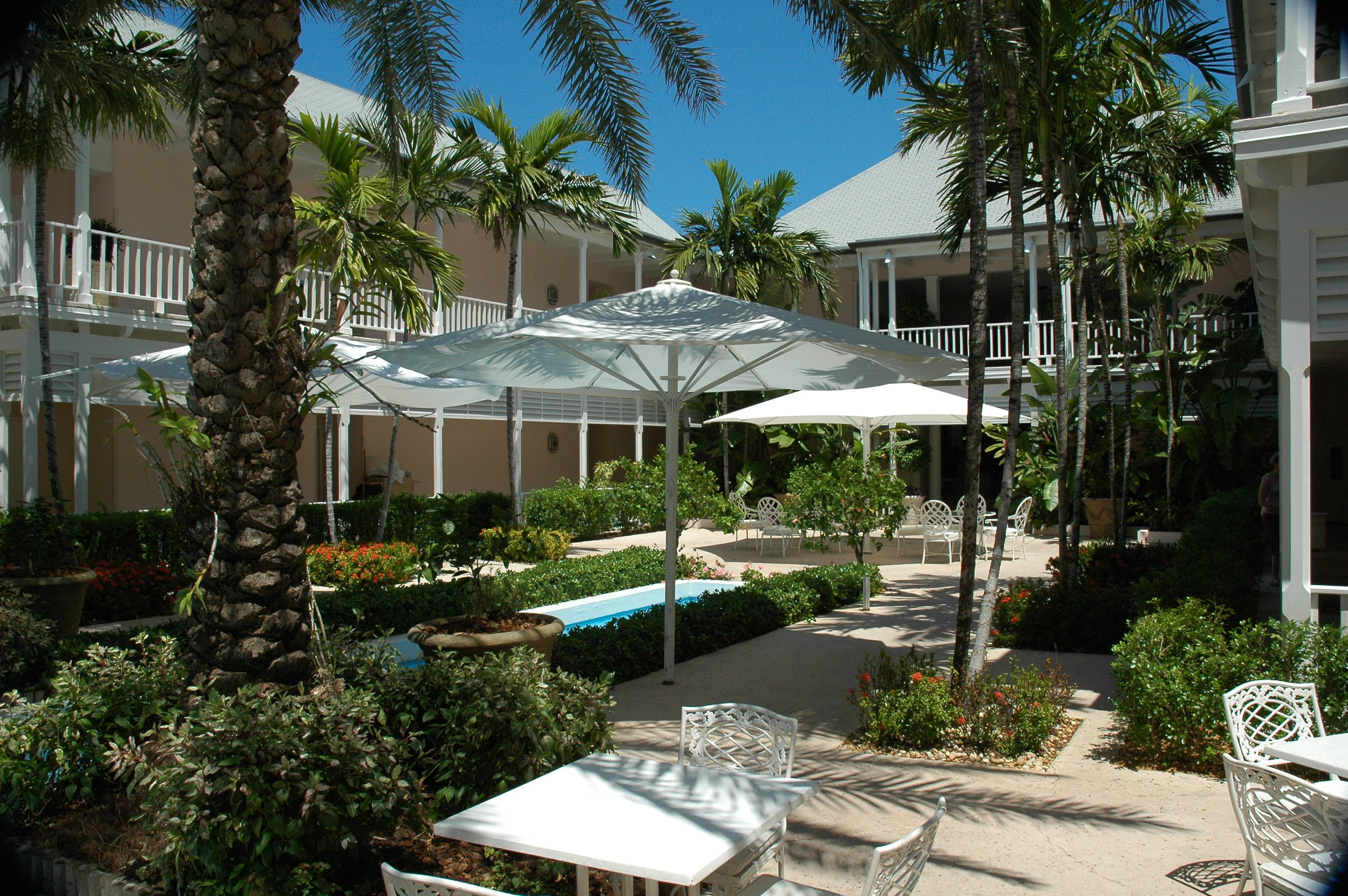
The Ocean Club courtyard

The Ocean Club is a Four Seasons Resort located on Paradise Island, Bahamas. It was founded in 1962 after the renaming of Hog Island to Paradise Island by Huntington Hartford. The Hartford Wing (Named after Huntington Hartford) and DUNE by Jean-Georges were renovated in 2016 by Jeffrey Beers International following Hurricane Matthew. The Four Seasons and Access Industries took over management of the ocean club from the previous owner, One&Only/Sol Kerzner, in 2017. Kerzner had overseen extensive renovations at the Ocean Club in the early 2000s.

== Restaurants ==
The resort features five restaurants, including DUNE by Jean-Georges, which was founded by Jean-Georges Vongerichten in 2000 before The Four Seasons arrived.

== Residences ==
The resort has more than 100 accommodations, cottages and villas on 35 acres. A development of private condominium residences broke ground in 2024 with the help of Prime Minister Chester Cooper. These residences are set to open in 2027, include 67 turnkey residences and will be designed by SB Architects and Champalimaud Design. Construction will be done by Etro Construction Limited. A resident-only pool area is at the center of the complex, and all residences feature ocean views.

== Filming location ==
The following films used the Ocean Club as a filming location:

- Thunderball (1965)
- My Father the Hero (1994)
- Casino Royale (2006)
- Duplicity (2009)
- The Wolf of Wall Street (2013)
