= Paradise Island =

Resort island in Nassau, Bahamas

- Paradise Island viewed from Nassau Cruise Port

- Location within Bahamas Location within North Atlantic

Geography
- Location: Atlantic Ocean
- Coordinates: 25°05′N 77°20′W
- Archipelago: Lucayan Archipelago

Administration
- Bahamas

Demographics
- Population: 8,000

Additional information
- Time zone: EST (UTC-5)
  - Summer (DST): EDT (UTC-4)
- ISO code: BS-NP

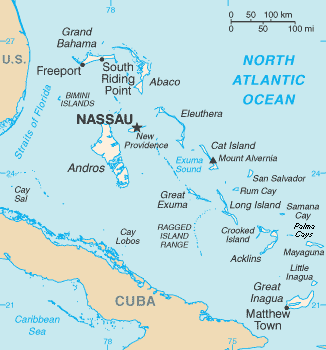
Map depicting New Providence Island which is connected to Paradise Island via two bridges. Both islands are within capital city Nassau's harbour.

Paradise Island is an island in the Bahamas formerly known as Hog Island. The island, with an area of 277 hectares (685 acres) (2.8 km^{2}/1.1 sq mi), is just off the shore of the city of Nassau, which is itself on the northern edge of the island of New Providence.

It is best known for the sprawling resort Atlantis, with its extensive water park rides, pools, beach, restaurants, walk-in aquarium, and casinos.

Paradise Island is connected to New Providence by two bridges that cross Nassau Harbour. The first was built in 1966 by Resorts International, and the second in the late 1990s.

== Recent history ==
=== Purchase by Huntington Hartford and development as a resort ===
Huntington Hartford, the A&P supermarket heir, arrived on Hog Island in 1959. Hartford bought Hog Island from Axel Wenner-Gren in 1960-1961 and changed the name to Paradise Island in 1962. He hired the Palm Beach architect John Volk and built the Ocean Club, Cafe Martinique, Hurricane Hole, and the Golf Course, among other island landmarks. He also acquired and installed the Cloisters, a 14th-century French Augustinian monastery originally purchased in Montréjeau and dismantled by William Randolph Hearst in the 1920s. He hired Gary Player to be the golf pro and Pancho Gonzales to be the tennis pro. Newsweek and Time magazines covered Paradise Island's 1962 opening. Hartford hired staff from Hôtel du Cap-Eden-Roc, Antibes (on the French Riviera) to work off season at the Ocean Club. He had the fireworks for the opening party flown in from the South of France. He had a flag and Paradise Beach was featured on Bahamian three-dollar notes in 1966 (introduced as a close equivalent to the Bahamian Pound, which was replaced at the rate of $1 = £7, so $3 = £21).

=== Paradise Island Airport ===
There was a small airstrip on the island from 1989 to 1999 to serve the resort. Before 1989 the airport was a seaplane base with a ramp for aircraft to leave the water. In 1989 a 910-metre (3,000 ft) runway was added to the airport. The airport's codes were PID (IATA) and MYPI (ICAO). Paradise Island Airlines and Chalk's International Airlines were the airport's main tenants. US Airways Express also served the airport from Fort Lauderdale-Hollywood International Airport.

The STOL capable de Havilland Canada DHC-7 Dash 7 turboprop operated by Paradise Island Airlines as well the Grumman G-73 Mallard amphibian aircraft flown by Chalk's International Airlines both served the airstrip, which closed in 1999. The airfield and runway have since been removed and replaced by an 18-hole luxury golf course surrounded by one of the island's wealthiest neighbourhoods. The area goes by the name "Ocean Club", with property prices as high as $40 million.

=== Development as a gambling resort ===
Hartford met James M. Crosby through Hartford's bodyguard Sy Alter. Alter met Crosby at the Colony Club in Palm Beach. Hartford obtained a gambling licence for Paradise Island and included Crosby as an extra investor. Crosby and Jack Davis then formed a company, Resorts International, to continue developing the island.

Paradise Island was purchased in the 1980s for $79 million, then sold to Merv Griffin for $400 million. It was last sold for $125 million to Sol Kerzner.

== Gallery ==
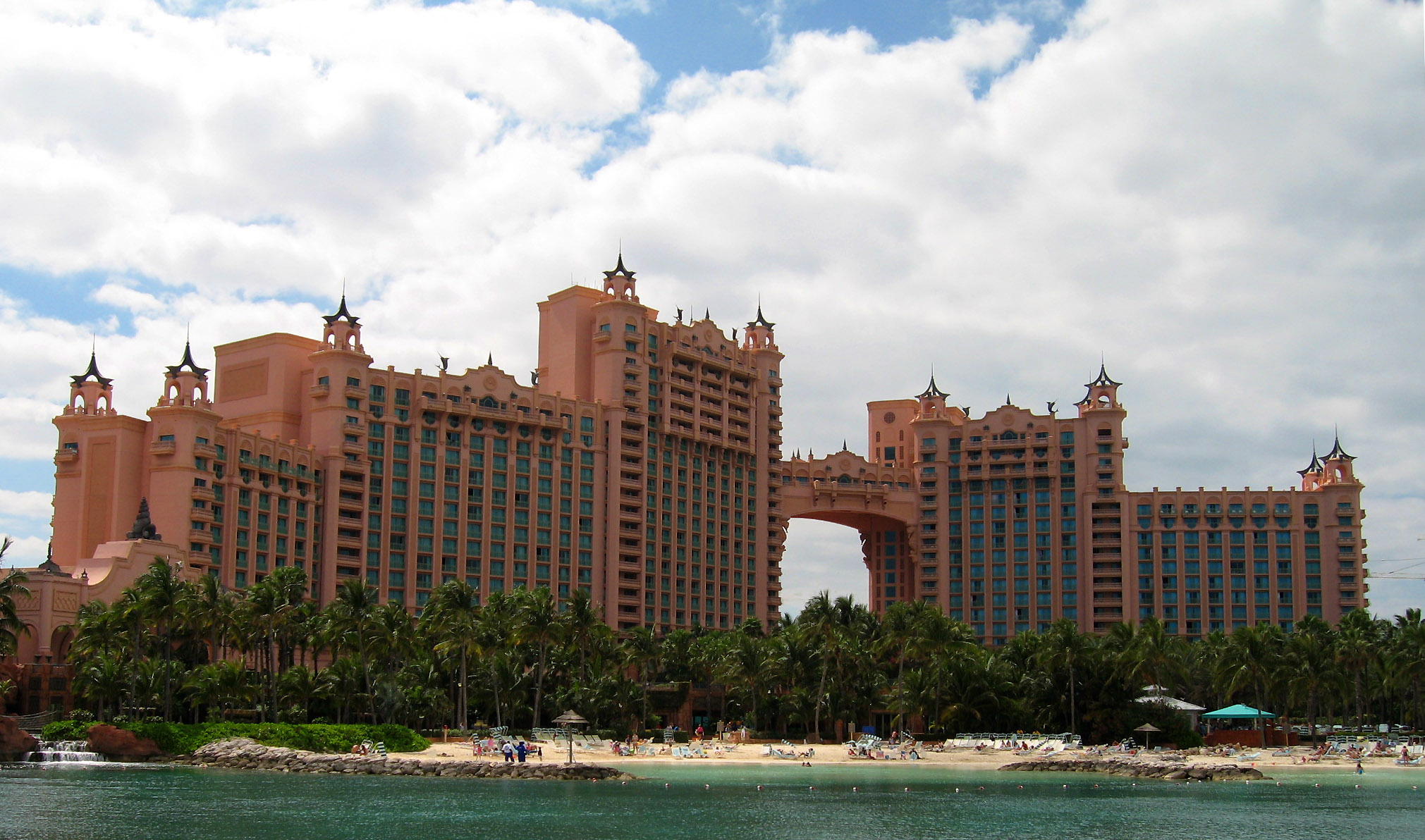
The Royal Towers joined by the Bridge. The Bridge Suite, located in the span, is among the most expensive accommodations in the world at $25,000 a night.

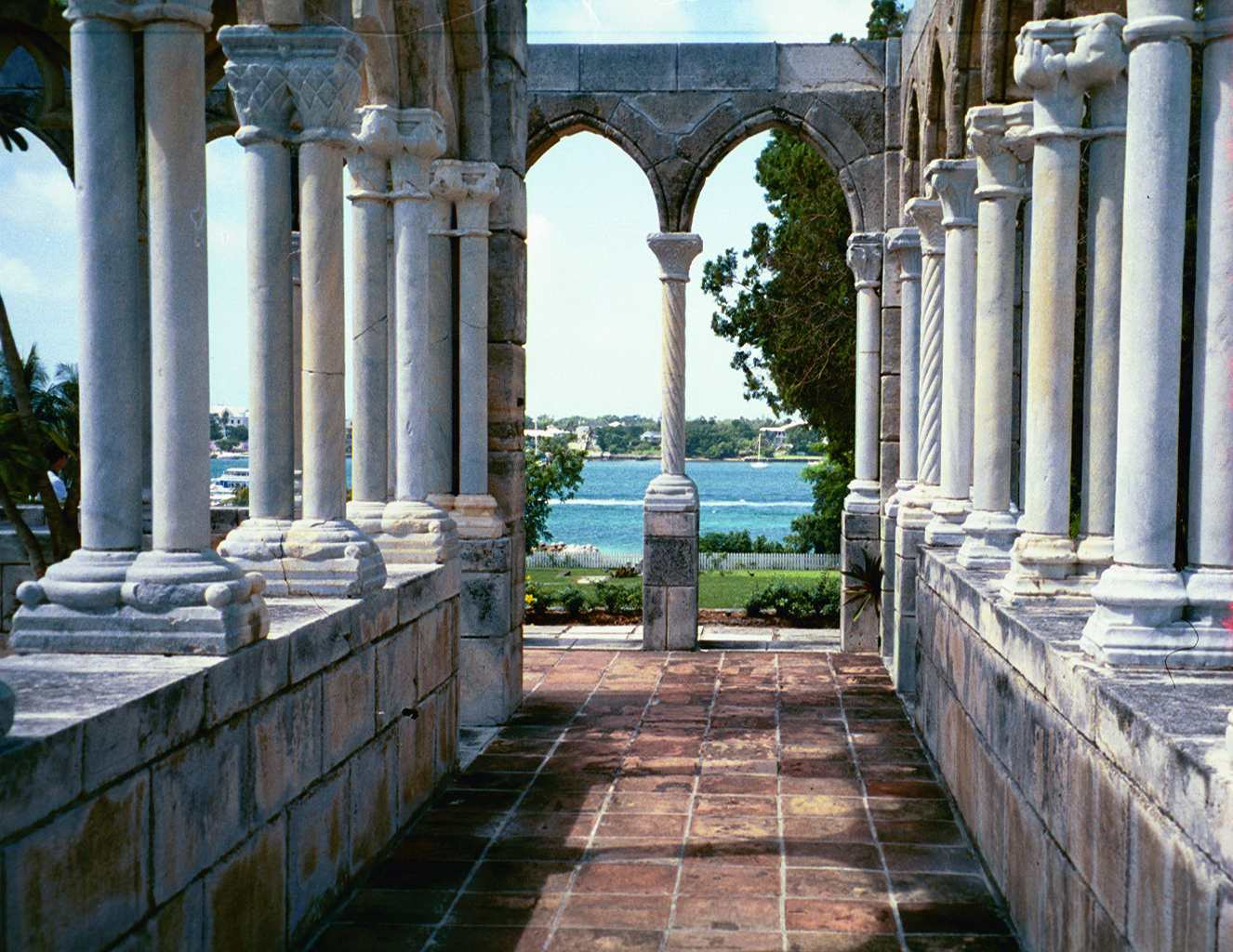
View towards Nassau from The Cloisters on Paradise Island.

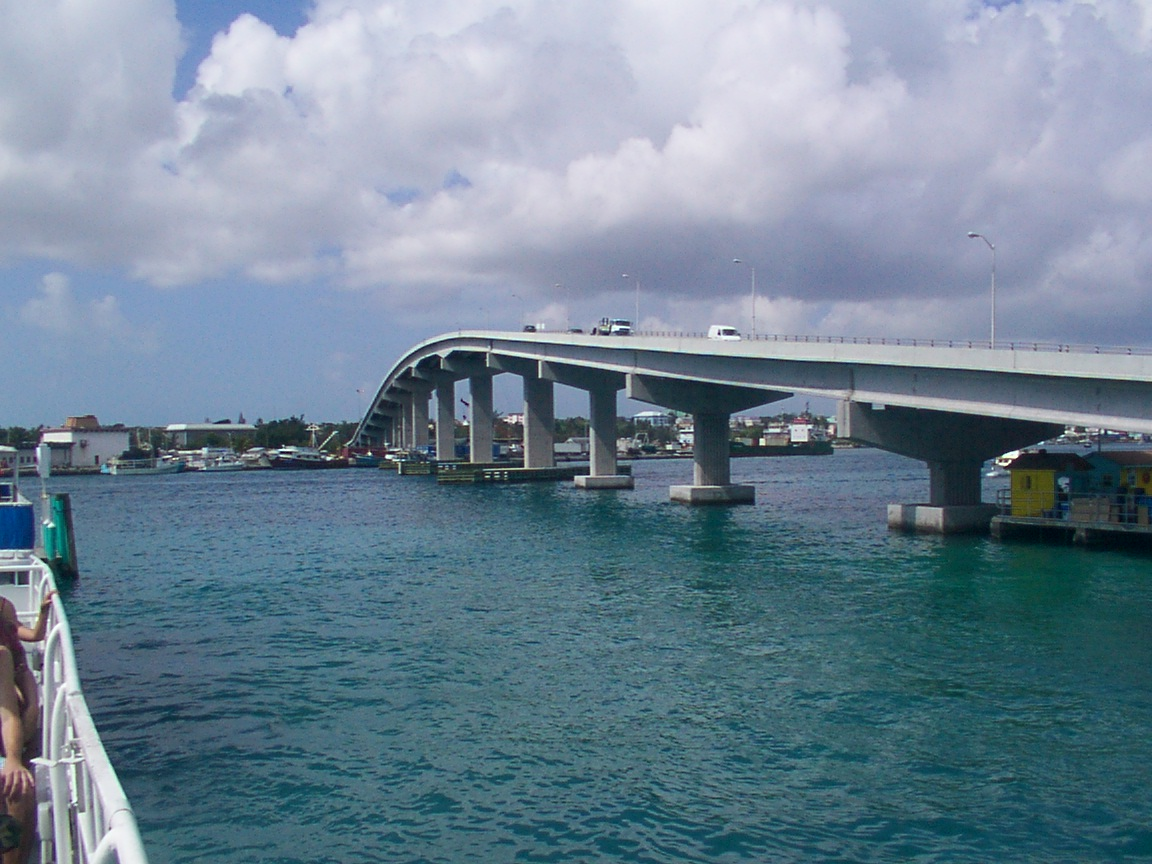
Bridge from Nassau to Paradise Island

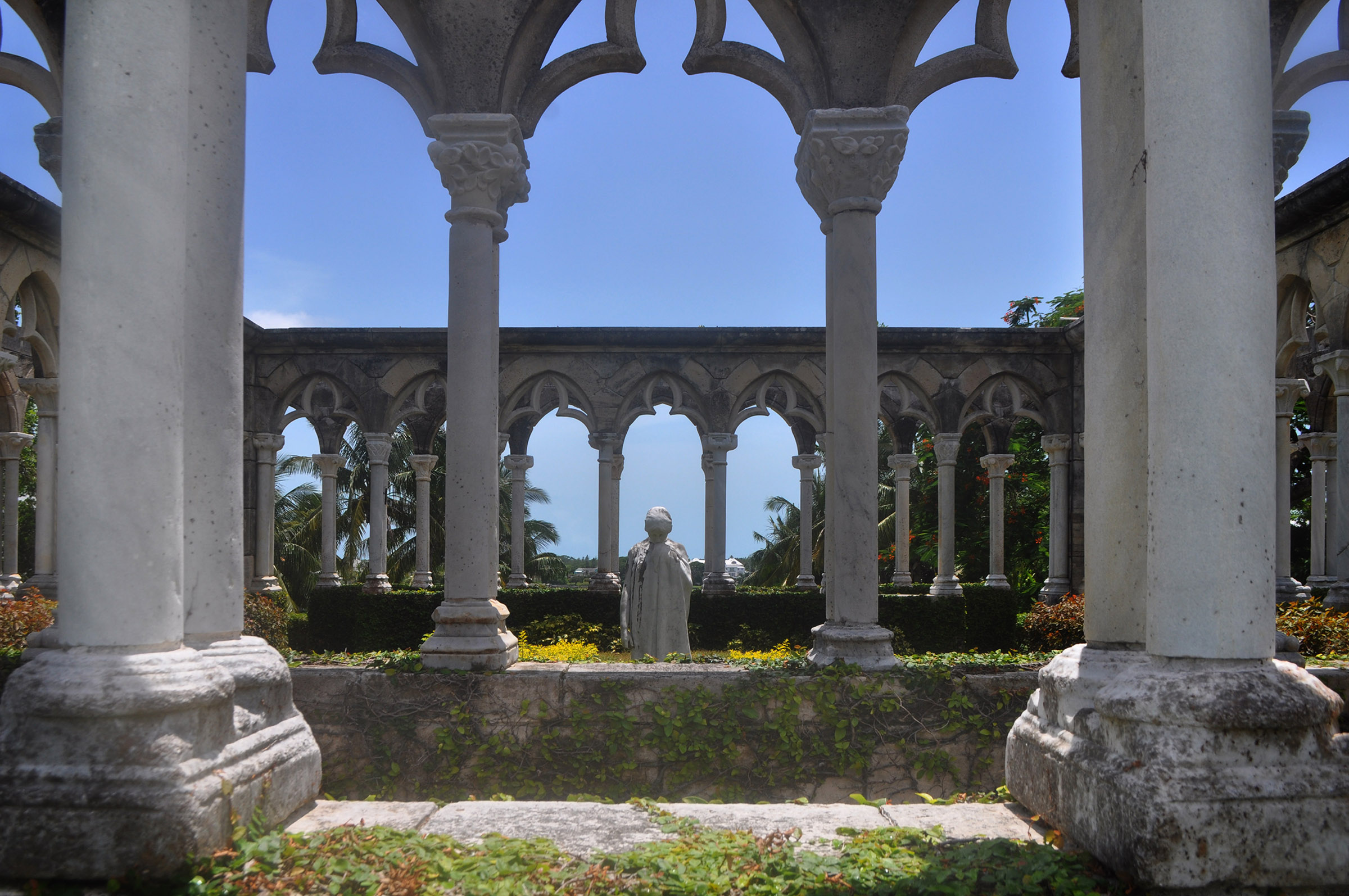
The French Cloisters is the reconstructed remains of the cloisters of a 14th-century French monastery.

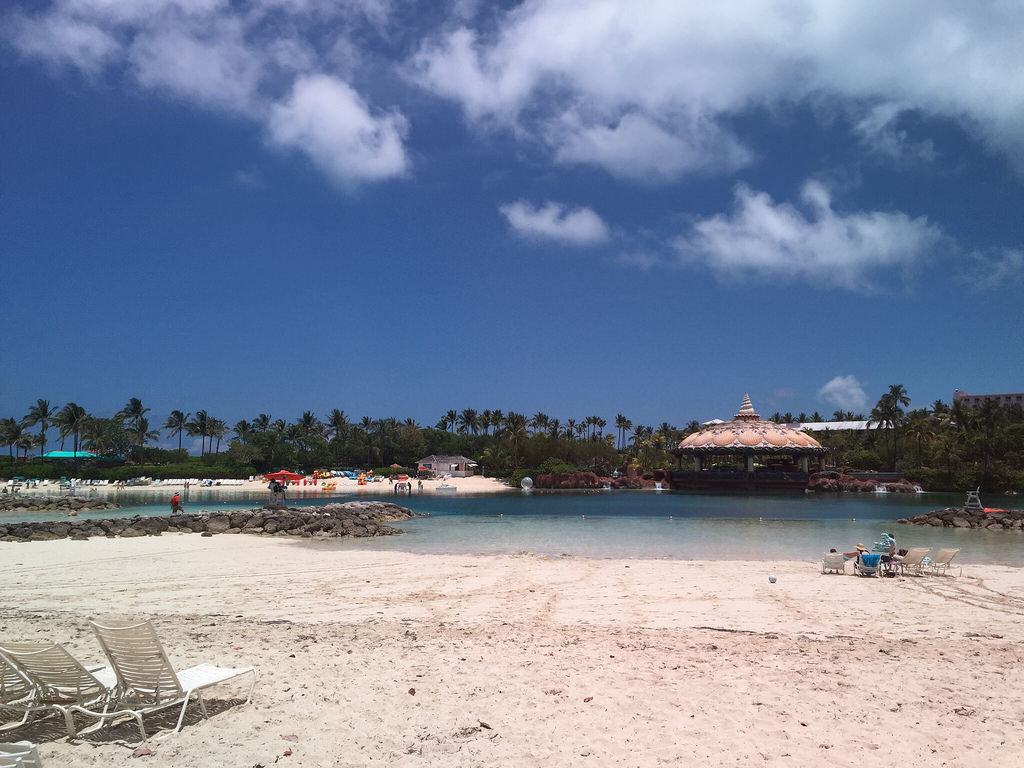
Lagoon at Atlantis Resort

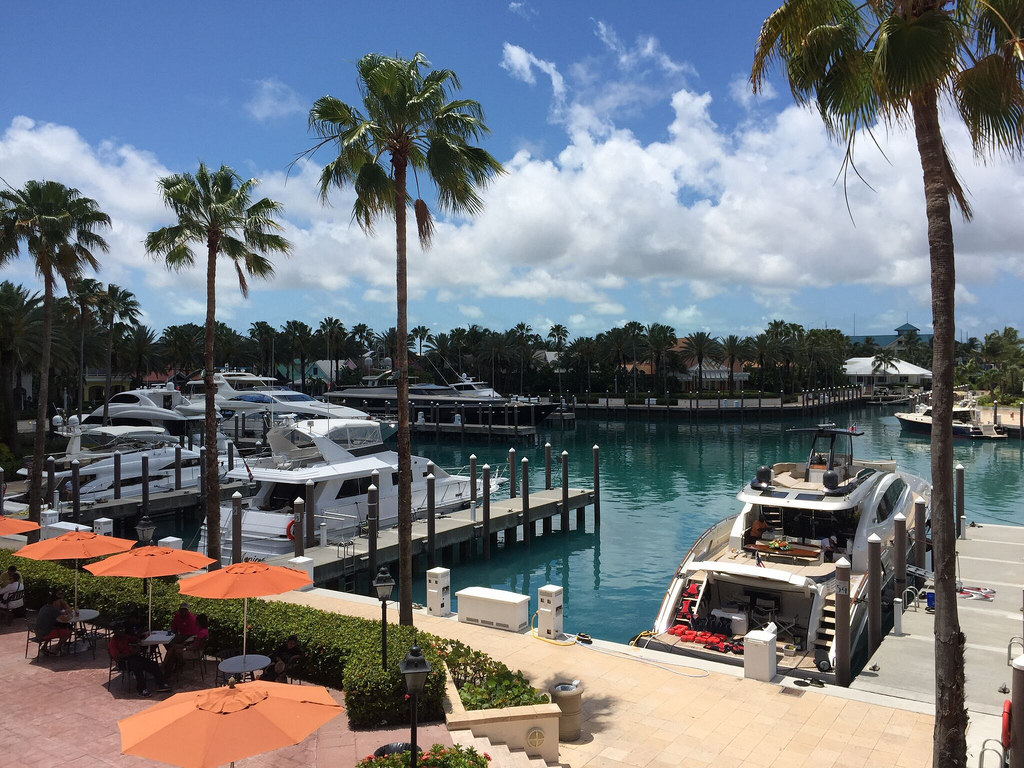
Marina at Atlantis Resort

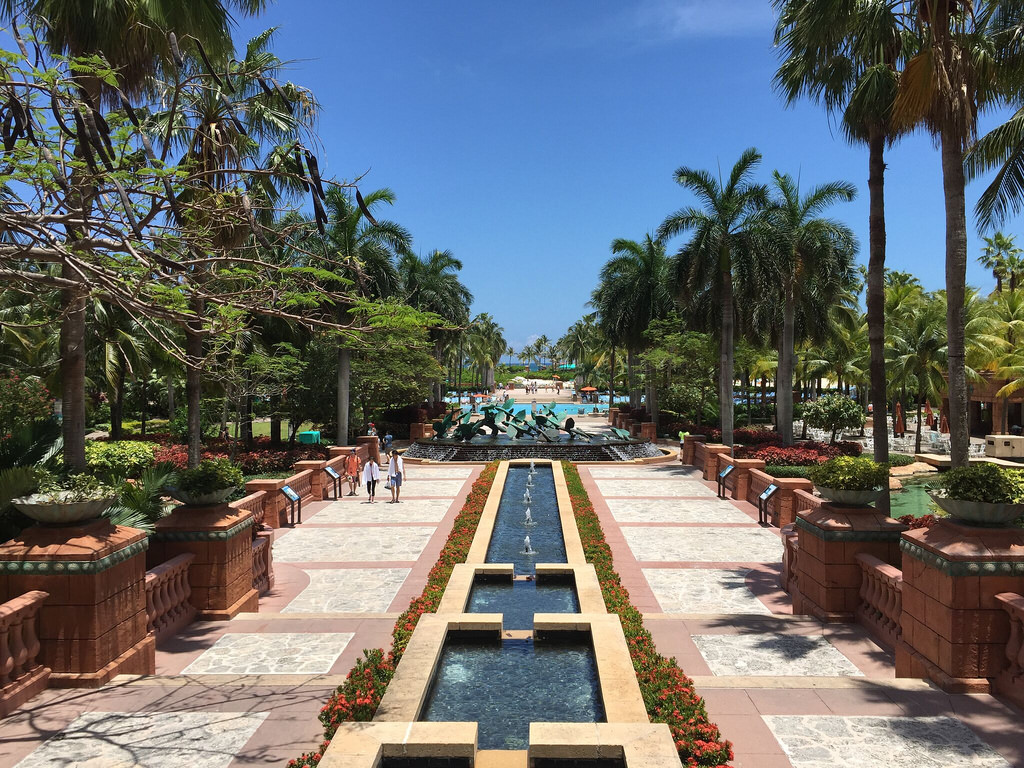
Atlantis Resort

== Climate ==
Climate data for Paradise Island
Month	Jan	Feb	Mar	Apr	May	Jun	Jul	Aug	Sep	Oct	Nov	Dec	Year
Mean daily maximum °C (°F)	25 (77)	—	—	—	—	—	—	—	—	30 (86)	28 (82)	26 (79)	—
Mean daily minimum °C (°F)	17 (63)	17 (63)	18 (64)	19 (66)	21 (70)	23 (73)	24 (75)	24 (75)	24 (75)	22 (72)	20 (68)	18 (64)	21 (69)
Average rainfall mm (inches)	39 (1.5)	42 (1.7)	30 (1.2)	46 (1.8)	117 (4.6)	217 (8.5)	150 (5.9)	168 (6.6)	178 (7.0)	182 (7.2)	60 (2.4)	44 (1.7)	1,273 (50.1)
Mean monthly sunshine hours	217	232	248	270	279	248	278	279	210	217	210	217	2,905
Source: http://www.worldclimateguide.co.uk/climateguides/bahamas/paradiseisland.php

== In popular culture ==
=== Films ===
- The Beatles' film Help! (1965) was partially filmed on Paradise Island.
- The film My Father the Hero (1994) was filmed at Paradise Island.
- Atlantis Paradise Island is prominent in the Mary-Kate and Ashley Olsen film Holiday in the Sun (2001).
- A larger part of the island is shown in the movie After the Sunset (2004).
- The James Bond films Thunderball (1965) and Casino Royale (2006) were partially shot on Paradise Island.
- The film The Other Woman (2014) features a section of Paradise Island's beach.

=== Television ===
- The TV show My Wife and Kids filmed one episode on Paradise Island.
- Survivor: All-Stars contestants Rob Mariano and Amber Brkich were married on Paradise Island in a two-hour TV special.
- The American Dad episode "Bahama Mama" is set in the Atlantis Resort on Paradise Island.

== Bibliography ==
- Block, Alan A. (1998). Masters of Paradise. New Brunswick and London: Transaction Publishers. ISBN 1-56000-971-3.
