= Masaharu Morimoto =

Japanese chef (born 1955)

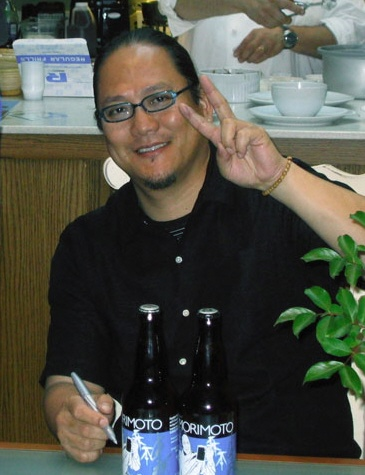
- Masaharu Morimoto in 2004
- Born: May 26, 1955 (age 71); Hiroshima, Hiroshima Prefecture, Japan
- Culinary career
- Cooking style: Japanese Fusion
- Current restaurants
- Morimoto, Wasabi, Morimoto XEX. Morimoto at Camino Real Hotel in Polanco, Mexico City, Momosan
- Television shows
- Iron Chef, Iron Chef America, The Next Iron Chef, Hawaii Five-0, Hell's Kitchen, Morimoto's Sushi Master

Masaharu Morimoto (森本 正治, Morimoto Masaharu; born May 26, 1955) is a Japanese chef, best known as an Iron Chef on the Japanese TV cooking show Iron Chef and its spinoff Iron Chef America. He is also known for his unique style of presenting food.

== Career ==
Morimoto was born in Hiroshima, where he received practical training in sushi and traditional Kaiseki cuisine; he opened his own restaurant in that city in 1980. Influenced by Western cooking styles, he decided to sell his restaurant in 1985 to travel around the United States. His travels further influenced his fusion style of cuisine. He established himself in New York City and worked in some of Manhattan's restaurants, including the dining area for Sony Corporation's executive staff and visiting VIPs, the Sony Club, where he was executive chef, and at the exclusive Japanese restaurant Nobu, where he was head chef.

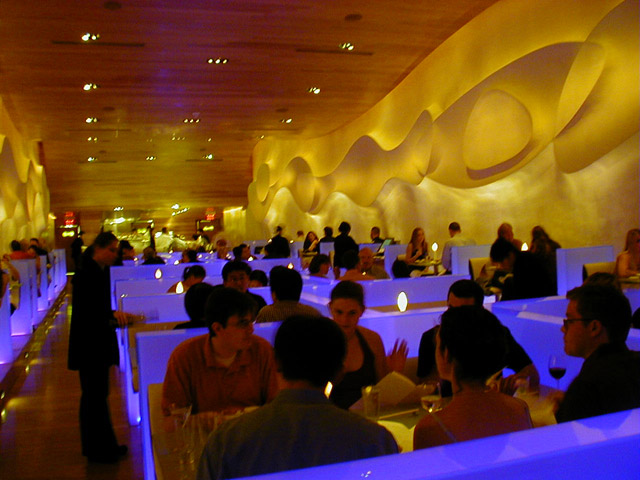
Interior of Morimoto Restaurant in Philadelphia, 2003

While at Nobu he got his start on the Iron Chef television show. Several months after the weekly run of Iron Chef ended in 1999, he left Nobu to collaborate with Starr Restaurants and opening his own Morimoto restaurant in Philadelphia in 2001. His first expansion was a Morimoto restaurant in Chelsea in New York City. Architecturally, this New York City restaurant has exposed concrete, a signature element of architect Tadao Ando, who designed the restaurant in collaboration with Goto Design Group and structural engineers Leslie E. Robertson Associates. Morimoto has restaurants in Mumbai and New Delhi called Wasabi and has opened multiple locations of Morimoto around the world.

In July 2010, he opened a Napa Valley location of his flagship Morimoto restaurant, followed in October 2010 by a Waikiki, Hawaii location, and a Maui location in October 2013. Morimoto Waikiki closed in December 2016. In 2018 the chef announced two new ventures for the neighborhood, branches of his Morimoto Asia and Momosan chains.

In November 2012, Morimoto opened Tribeca Canvas in New York's Tribeca neighborhood, featuring Asian-inflected takes on American comfort food. After a string of bad reviews and flagging business, he closed the restaurant for a revamp in August 2013, and that October opened the restaurant Bisutoro, with his interpretations of classic bistro fare, in the same space. Bisutoro suffered the same fate as its predecessor and closed in January 2014.

Morimoto also owns Morimoto XEX in Tokyo, a spin on his Morimoto concept with separate Teppanyaki and sushi floors. Morimoto XEX received a Michelin star in the 2008 Tokyo Michelin Guide. Morimoto appeared as an Iron Chef in Iron Chef America, a spinoff from the original Japanese Iron Chef series, and in its spinoffs The Next Iron Chef and Iron Chef Gauntlet. Chef Morimoto has also developed a line of specialty beers in collaboration with Rogue Ales of Newport, Oregon, consisting of the Imperial Pilsner, Soba Ale, and Black Obi Soba Ale.

In 2005, he partnered with businessmen Paul Ardaji, a credited Film Producer (ALI) starring Will Smith, and Paul Ardaji, Jr., through Ardaji Restaurant Ventures, LLC in an aborted Asian bistro venture which was to be called PauliMotos Asian Bistro. The relationship between the Ardajis and the Iron Chef broke down when the Ardajis could not raise the $20 million necessary capital to open 11 locations throughout the United States.

On February 5, 2014 Japonais reopened under Morimoto’s ownership as Japonais by Morimoto. It closed on October 16, 2015, following disagreements with its management company.

In September 2015, Morimoto opened the Pan-Asian restaurant Morimoto Asia at Disney Springs in Walt Disney World in Florida.

In April 2016, Morimoto opened the restaurant Momosan Ramen & Sake on Lexington Ave. in New York City.

In October 2016, Morimoto opened Morimoto Las Vegas located inside the MGM Grand hotel on the Las Vegas Strip.

In October 2021, Morimoto opened the restaurant Momosan Ramen Boston inside The Hub on Causeway in Boston, Massachusetts.

In December 2023, Morimoto by Sea opened its doors on Holland America Line's Nieuw Amsterdam. The restaurant specializes in modern pan-Asian cuisine, offering a selection of vegetarian and vegan options. Notable menu items include Morimoto Fresh Tuna Pizza; Tempura Calamari Salad; Angry Lobster Pad Thai; and Ishiyaki Buri Bop, which is cooked tableside on a hot stone.

In July 2025, Morimoto opened MM by Morimoto in Montclair, NJ. It specializes in Japanese‑American fusion cuisine featuring premium ingredients like tuna pizza, A5 Wagyu carpaccio, and Tacos Two Ways.

== Iron Chef ==
Morimoto's official win/loss/tie record on Iron Chef is 16-7-1.

Morimoto's costume on Iron Chef was silver with red trim and a picture on the back of Japanese and American flags tied together in a sheaf. On Iron Chef America, he donned the standard blue Iron Chef outfit with white trim and a patch of the Japanese flag on his sleeve (the other Iron Chefs having flags from their respective countries on their sleeves). In his professional life, to distinguish himself from his on-screen persona, Morimoto wears (purely aesthetic) glasses.

Unlike his predecessor, Koumei Nakamura, Morimoto's introduction as an Iron Chef came with little fanfare, debuting the week following Nakamura's retirement battle against Yukio Hattori. Morimoto was chosen based on his style of cooking, which seemed to border on fusion cuisine, as well as his international experience.

Morimoto was initially reluctant to accept the title of Iron Chef, but accepted fearing the show would hire someone else. Originally, he had planned to incorporate some of the dishes that he had routinely prepared in New York for Iron Chef, but discovered that previous challengers and Iron Chefs had already made similar dishes. He would become known as the Iron Chef whose dishes always seemed to come out of left field—a famous example is his Bell Pepper Sushi in a sushi battle in 1999. He would usually have a bottle of Coca-Cola to drink while cooking on the show; on one occasion he combined it with nattō to fashion a dessert dish.

Morimoto competed in the first sushi battle in Kitchen Stadium on June 18, 1999, against challenger Keiji Nakazawa. There were five theme ingredients for the battle: tuna, eggs, Kohada (Japanese Gizzard Shad), Anago, and Kanpyō. Both chefs were given time before the battle to properly prepare the sushi rice (sushi-meshi). Morimoto defeated Nakazawa.

Morimoto is also memorable for being the target of Tadamichi Ohta, a vice-chairman of the Japanese Culinary Association and head of the notorious "Ohta Faction" of Japanese chefs, themselves noted for targeting all the Japanese Iron Chefs starting with Michiba. The Ohta faction lost three battles with Chef Morimoto before finally winning one when challenger Seiya Masahara defeated Morimoto in the anglerfish battle. The Ohta faction was not happy with just one win, however, and they sent in challenger Yusuke Yamashita, a sake specialist, to battle Morimoto. At that time, Morimoto had lost two straight battles and no Iron Chef had ever lost three in a row. The theme ingredient for that battle was cod roe and the battle ended in a tie. The overtime theme ingredient was scallions and Morimoto was able to defeat Yamashita in a 3–1 decision.

In his first battle with Bobby Flay in New York, battle rock crab, Morimoto famously declared that Flay was "not a chef" because Flay stood up on his chopping board after completing his dishes. Morimoto went on to defeat Flay in the New York Battle, the results of which Flay contested believing he was "given inferior cooking space and equipment" and because he had cut himself in addition to suffering several electric shocks during the battle. This led to the two chefs competing once again in Japan during the 21st Century Battles. Morimoto lost to Flay in the re-match with Japanese lobster as the theme ingredient. Nevertheless, Flay would become an Iron Chef along with Morimoto in the American spin-off, Iron Chef America. The two would face off a third time with Morimoto defeating Flay during the Holiday Ice Battle in November 2009. A fourth battle between the two would take place in an episode which aired on January 1, 2012, with Flay and Marcela Valladolid defeating Morimoto and teammate Andrew Zimmern in a sea whistle salmon battle by a narrow 51-50 margin.

== Iron Chef America ==
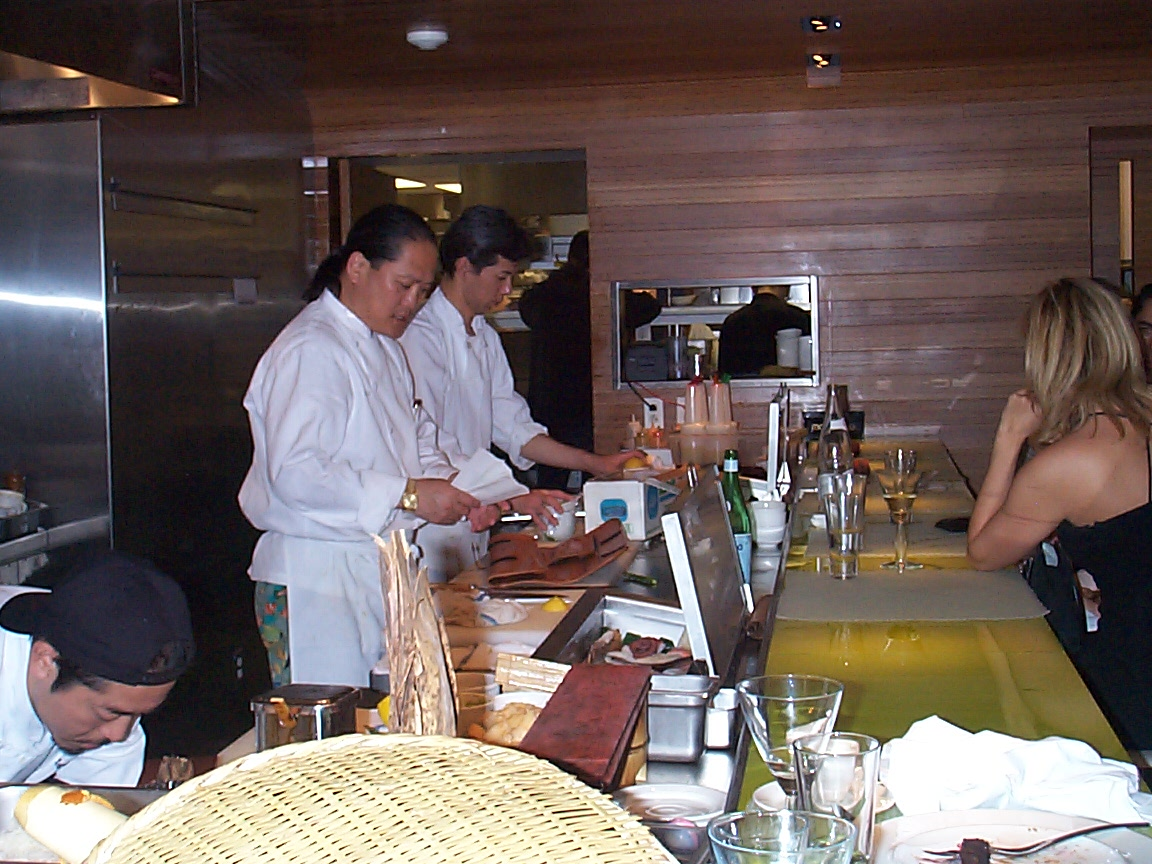
Morimoto at work in 2002

Morimoto and Hiroyuki Sakai were the only two original Iron Chefs to appear on Iron Chef America: Battle of the Masters. On this Food Network special series, he lost two battles with American Iron Chefs Mario Batali and Wolfgang Puck, but won a tag team battle along with partner Bobby Flay against Batali and Sakai.

When Iron Chef America was greenlighted as a regular series, it moved from Los Angeles to New York. When Puck was unavailable, Morimoto came on board to replace him. His voice is usually dubbed by American voiceover personality Joe Cipriano during the judgment phase of the show; during the battle, his use of English is not dubbed, but conversations with his sous-chefs in Japanese are subtitled. In 2007, Morimoto's third year at Iron Chef America, he published his first cookbook, Morimoto: The Art of New Japanese Cooking.

As of October 2021, Morimoto's win/loss/tie record on Iron Chef America is 26–17–1, and his total combined record for both Iron Chef series is 41–21–2.

Morimoto opened a restaurant in the Boca Raton Resort & Club in late 2008. He has spent time there ensuring a successful launch of the restaurant.

In The Next Iron Chef, Iron Chef Morimoto has made several appearances as a guest judge.

== Other television appearances ==
In 1999, Masaharu Morimoto and Rokusaburo Michiba went to Indonesia appearing on Resep Oke Rudy broadcast on RCTI and Media Partner Tabloid Wanita Indonesia.

In the 2010 season of American version of Hell's Kitchen, Iron Chef Morimoto made an appearance on the show teaching the contestants how to make sushi. The contestants then had to replicate his dish.

In Season 8 of Top Chef, Iron Chef Morimoto was the Guest Judge. Each finalist had to make a "Last Supper" for one of the judges. Finalist Antonia Lofaso prepared a traditional Japanese meal for Morimoto, consisting of miso soup and a sashimi bento. He returned to Top Chef in Season 21 as the final group of chefs participated on a cruise line. Before the group of them had to prepare an 8-course fish meal together, Morimoto cooked them dinner. He discussed his work in creating a global fish program with Holland America Line. He serves as an ambassador.

In 2016 he participated as a guest in the 6th edition of Masterchef Italia. His task was to evaluate the contestants in cooking a selection of Japanese dishes.

Morimoto has made guest appearances as himself on the CBS television series Hawaii Five-0, which is filmed on location in Hawaii. He made his first appearance in the season 1 episode "Ma Ke Kahakai".

In Season 10 of MasterChef, Iron Chef Morimoto was the Guest Judge for the King of the Crabs battle.

Morimoto made a guest appearance in the 4 Million Subscriber Special of Binging with Babish, in which he prepared fugu for Andrew Rea's "death sandwich."

In November 2022, The Roku Channel ordered a cooking competition series featuring the chef, Morimoto's Sushi Master. The series is hosted by Lyrica Okano, with Morimoto serving as the lead judge. In September 2023, Roku renewed the series for a second season.

== Charity work ==
In April 2011, Morimoto sang at the Thousand Hearts Benefit for Japanese earthquake relief in California.

== Awards ==
- Culinary Hall of Fame Induction.
