= China Grill =

Defunct restaurant in New York City

- Interactive map of China Grill

Restaurant information
- Established: September 1987; 38 years ago
- Closed: 2017
- Location: 60 West 53rd Street, New York City, United States
- Coordinates: 40°45′40.143″N 73°58′40.09″W

China Grill (China Grill New York) was a restaurant at the CBS Building in Manhattan, New York City. It was established in 1987 and closed in 2017.

It was founded by partners Jeffrey Chodorow and Kenji Seki, with Seki both managing and fulfilling executive chef responsibilities. The menu was based on Seki's previous employer, Chinois on Main, which was located in Santa Monica, California and owned by Wolfgang Puck. He would return to Los Angeles a year later to start his restaurant called Noa Noa.

The dining room of China Grill occupied a full city block, with interior details such as Marco Polo quotes etched into the floor, high ceilings, granite walls, parasol-esque overhead lighting, and an open kitchen. These features were done by Jeffrey Beers International.

China Grill closed in 2017.

== See also ==
- China Grill Management
