= The Ritz-Carlton Reynolds, Lake Oconee =

Hotel located in Greensboro, Georgia

- Interactive map of The Ritz-Carlton Reynolds, Lake Oconee
- Location: Greensboro, Georgia; 1 Lake Oconee Trail; 33°26′20.099″N 83°11′40.231″W
- No. of rooms: 251
- Owner: MetLife
- Previous names: Reynolds Plantation
- Website: https://www.ritzcarlton.com/en/hotels/ahnrz-the-ritz-carlton-reynolds-lake-oconee/overview/

The Ritz-Carlton Reynolds Lake Oconee is a hotel in Greensboro, Georgia. The land was purchased by solidified cottonseed oil inventor Mercer Reynolds Sr. and his cousin James Madison Reynolds in the 1920s and 30s. Over the following half-century, the Reynolds family developed it into a gated community. They started allowing outside developments in the 1980s. The Ritz-Carlton opened there in 2002, with 251 rooms and suites. Before MetLife purchased the hotel from the Reynolds family in 2012, it was Reynolds Plantation. Amenities include nine restaurants, six golf courses designed by Jack Nicklaus, a spa, four marinas, multiple swimming pools, a fitness/tennis center, and paths for walking and biking.

== Renovations ==
The first renovation of the Ritz-Carlton Reynolds Lake Oconee was completed in 2015 and coincided with MetLife's purchase and rebranding from the previous Reynolds Plantation name. The update included the meeting space, outdoor infinity pool, and spa.

The second renovation was completed in 2024, and the Amore Del Lago restaurant was added while upgrading both the lobby and spa. Hodges and Hicks did the contracting, Grahl Construction did the construction, and Jeffrey Beers International designed the interiors.

== Restaurants ==
- Gaby's by the Lake
- Linger Longer Steakhouse
- Amore Del Lago
- Lobby Lounge
- Oconee Cove
- The Coffee Shop
- Splash Shack
- The Sand Bar
- The Barrel Room

== Awards ==
- 2022 AAA Four Diamond Award
- 2006-2015, 2023-2025 AAA Five Diamond Awards
- One Michelin Key
- Conde Nast Top 100 Spas
- Conde Nast Gold List
- 2022 Golf Inc. Awards: Best New Amenities
- 2017, 2018, 2024 Conde Nast Readers' Choice Awards
- 2024 Conde Nast 12 Best Hotels in Atlanta
