= Pier Sixty-Six, Fort Lauderdale, Florida =

Resort and Marina in Fort Lauderdale, Florida

- Interactive map of the Pier Sixty-Six, Fort Lauderdale, Florida area

General information
- Location: Fort Lauderdale, Florida
- Coordinates: 26°6′6″N 80°6′52″W
- Owner: Tavistock Development Company

Technical details
- Floor count: 17

Website
- https://www.piersixtysix.com/

Pier Sixty-Six is a resort and marina located in Fort Lauderdale, Florida. Situated on 32 acres, the Pier Sixty-Six property sits on the north and south sides of the 17th Street Causeway Bridge. In 2016, Tavistock Development Company acquired the property and initiated a redevelopment project for Pier Sixty-Six.

== History ==
Built in 1957 by the Phillips Petroleum Co., the original Pier 66 featured a hotel, marina, and a rotating lounge on top of a 17-story tower. The rotating lounge, known as the Pier Top, attracted locals and tourists, offering 360-degree views of the surrounding area.

== Redevelopment ==
In 2016, Tavistock Development Company acquired Pier Sixty-Six and started a redevelopment project. The redevelopment involves modernizing and expanding the resort and marina, as well as adding residences, shops and restaurants.

== Marina ==
The Pier Sixty-Six superyacht marina offers 5,000 linear feet of dockage with 164 slips, accommodating vessels up to 400 feet in length. It is a designated foreign trading zone that sits directly across from Port Everglades.

== Residences ==
The Residences at Pier Sixty-Six is a waterfront residential community that offer views of the Atlantic Ocean, Intracoastal Waterway, and Fort Lauderdale skyline.

== Resort ==
The resort is recognized for its tower which has become a symbol of the Fort Lauderdale skyline. Pier Sixty-Six is owned and developed by Tavistock Group and is managed by CoralTree Hospitality.
