= Ed's Chowder House =

Defunct seafood restaurant in New York City

Ed’s Chowder House
- Interactive map of Ed’s Chowder House

Restaurant information
- Established: 2009
- Closed: 2018
- Food type: Seafood
- Location: 44 West 63rd Street, New York City, United States, New York, 10065, United States
- Coordinates: 40°46′17.4036″N 73°58′57.63″W

Ed's Chowder House was a seafood restaurant in New York City. It opened in 2009 on the ground floor of The Empire Hotel at 44 W 63rd Street, Ed’s Chowder House quickly became a beloved seafood destination and a cherished fixture of the Upper West Side. Co-founded by Jeffrey Chodorow and renowned chef Ed Brown, the restaurant offered a unique and inviting dining experience, with Ed Brown serving as the head chef. The space had previously housed Chodorow's Center Cut steakhouse.

== Staff ==
In its inaugural year, the restaurant was led by Executive Chef Jamie Knott, followed by Johnny Miele, who helmed the kitchen from 2009 to 2012. Ed Brown then assumed the roles of both head chef and executive chef, further enhancing the restaurant’s reputation for quality and innovation. In August 2015, Ed Brown transitioned to a new position as chef/innovator with Restaurant Associates, allowing him to explore new culinary ventures.

Following Ed Brown's departure, Harold Moore took over as chef and made a notable change, renaming the establishment to Moore Food & Drink. However, after two months, Moore moved on, and the restaurant once again returned to its original identity as Ed’s Chowder House. Derek Dupree succeeded Moore and continued to lead the restaurant for another year.

== Closure ==
Ed’s Chowder House closed its doors in January 2018. The restaurant gave full refunds for all unused gift cards.
