= Beyoncé 2023 Dubai performance =

Beyoncé private concert

- Concert by Beyoncé
- Location: Palm Jumeirah, Dubai, United Arab Emirates
- Venue: Atlantis The Royal
- Date: January 21, 2023
- Attendance: 1,000–1,500

On January 21, 2023, American singer Beyoncé was asked to perform for an invitation-only crowd at Dubai’s Palm Jumeirah to commemorate the unveiling of a new luxury resort hotel, Atlantis The Royal. This was her first solo live performance since 2018. Beyoncé was reportedly paid over $24 million for the show, making it the highest-paying private concert in history, according to Forbes (not accounting for inflation). (Note: Michael Jackson was paid $17 million (equivalent to $34 million in 2024) in 1996, and the Rolling Stones were paid $18.7 million in 2002 (equivalent to $33 million in 2024).)

The ballad-heavy show was part of a three-day launch event for the hotel, in which journalists, celebrities, and influencers were invited.

Despite having a no-phone policy to prevent unlawful recordings, attempts to enforce these (and other) security measures largely went unnoticed, as many attendees filmed the concert successfully and uploaded the videos online. Parkwood Entertainment, Beyoncé's production company, subsequently released limited official photos and footage of the concert online.

== Background ==
Beyoncé invites you to a weekend where your dreams become your destination. You and a guest are invited for epicurean feasts, beachside indulgences, and special reveal experiences including business class airfare, first-class ground transportation, and first-class accommodations at Atlantis the Royal.

— Pitchfork's invite.

Beyoncé had first performed in Dubai in 2005, during Destiny's Child’s Destiny Fulfilled... and Lovin' It world tour, in which the trio performed at the Dubai Media City Amphitheatre. She then performed in the United Arab Emirates again as a solo artist, in 2009, during a pit stop on the I Am... World Tour at the Yas Marina Circuit for the inaugural 2009 Abu Dhabi Grand Prix, Abu Dhabi.

On December 23, 2022, British tabloid newspaper The Sun broke the news that Beyoncé would give an hour-long private performance at Atlantis, The Royal, on January 21, 2023, for allegedly more than $20 million. The concert was also noted as Beyoncé's first live appearance since the release of her seventh studio album, Renaissance, which came out just six months earlier. According to Forbes, Beyoncé was reportedly paid $24 million to perform for Atlantis The Royal, making her the highest-paid artist—at a one-time, private performance—in history.

Various publications were sent invites to a weekend in Dubai with courtesy expense and transport and promised an unspecified "once-in-a-lifetime" performance. Beyoncé reportedly underwent foot surgery before the performance.

On January 18, three days before the concert, fans reported hearing soundchecks for several of Beyoncé's songs outside the hotel. Security lined up around the area in preparation for the event.

== Performance ==
On January 21, Beyoncé gave the private performance in front of Atlantis The Royal hotel. It was ballad-heavy and her first solo concert since 2018. There was a fireworks display and drone show. Beyoncé performed seventeen tracks from her own discography while interpolating and incorporating elements of other songs. Companioning Firdaus Orchestra performed renditions of songs by regional musicians, including Algerian singer Warda's "Batwanes Beek", and Lebanese singer Fairuz's "Li Beirut". Beyoncé performed "Brown Skin Girl" with her daughter Blue Ivy.

The show incorporated Renaissance-era and Middle Eastern instruments like the oud (stringed lute), buzuq (a long-necked, fretted lute), riq (tambourine) and darbuka (goblet drum). Beyoncé was accompanied by musical ensemble 1500 or Nothin', and Firdaus Orchestra, a 24-nationality, Dubai-based all-woman orchestra.

Beyoncé was backed by Lebanese all-female dance group The Mayyas. She was raised 16 feet into the air.

Swedish House Mafia performed following Beyoncé at the opening's afterparty.

== Fashion and stage design ==
Beyoncé aimed to highlight emerging regional talent instead of those established. She did three costume changes, and was styled by frequent stylist collaborator KJ Moody. Two chosen up-and-coming designers included Mousa Al Awfi and Rayan Al Sulaimani through the Dubai-based mother-daughter owned label Atelier Zuhra, and Chris Habana for a Nicolas Jebran piece. Al Awfi tailored a yellow gown with a high feathered skirt, Manolo Blahnik shoes, a structured bare corset and a Marabou train resembling wings. Jebran tailored a full cape skirt linked to a red corset with gold stone embellishments, to which Beyoncé wore Lorraine Schwartz earrings and a Habana-styled Swarovski-crystal embellished "halo" headpiece. Beyoncé closed the show dressed in Malone Souliers shoes and in a custom pink "firework-inspired" corset dress by Ukrainian designer Ivan Frolov, who created it in the brand's Kyiv workshop against a "backdrop of catastrophic circumstances," to pay homage to the people of Ukraine.

Beyoncé's daughter Blue Ivy was dressed in a red sequin jumpsuit designed by her grandmother Tina Knowles and Timothy White. In coordination with Beyoncé's wardrobe team and the event's general theme, the Firdaus Orchestra wore red sequined gowns and jumpers, designed by Arshia Alam of Emirati brand Arshys, who has worked with the orchestra since their debut performance.

The stage backdrop was inspired by Ancient Greece as a reimagined version of Raphael's "The School of Athens" painting, with Black phenotypical features and hair textures of white stone sculptures, instead of those originally painted of white people. The Firdaus Orchestra studio staff and Adi Modi created the stage monitors for the orchestra and concert.

== Audience ==
No photography or video is permitted for this private Beyoncé performance. We ask that you enjoy this once in a lifetime show and therefore no photography or videography will be permitted. We request that you put your phone in the pouch provided to respect the privacy of the artist. We will be messaging you towards the end of the show to let you know when you can capture the grand reveal moment.

— Memo circulated to all guests, titled "The Royal Reveal"

The performance was invite-only and the concert had a no-phone policy. Attendees were asked to put their phones or any other recording devices in locked pouches to stop them from filming the performance. Despite this and other security measures, many videos of the concert quickly surfaced online. Some non-invitees livestreamed the concert online as it happened from across the waterbody surrounding Atlantis The Royal. American singer Lizzo watched one of these, tweeting "I have seen Beyoncé perform live 10 times in my lifetime... and today the 11th time was on [an Instagram] live across a body of water of a hotel." Beyoncé's production company Parkwood Entertainment then made a small number of official concert images and clips available to the public.

== Launch event ==
Atlantis The Royal was originally set to open in October 2022 but was rescheduled for 2023. The resort became open to the public and available for reservation on February 10, 2023, and the launch event lasted three days. Journalists, celebrities, and influencers were invited, given accommodation at the hotel and given first class airfare on Emirates.

=== January 22 ===
Beyoncé hosted a fashion show to showcase an Ivy Park collection titled "Park Trail". Models displayed items at Nobu by the Beach (one of the eight restaurants at the resort). Some items of clothing worn from the collection included jackets, coats, blazers, hoodies, sweat suits and jersey dresses. The pieces were "inspired by the resilience of the outdoors, the spirit of the streets, and the possibilities of the future". Beyoncé did not attend but instead her music was DJed by her creative director Andrew Makadsi. Songs included "Break My Soul," "Cuff It," "Cozy" and "Heated", all from Renaissance. Also played was Janet Jackson’s "What Have You Done for Me Lately" and Madonna’s "Vogue".

== Public response ==
Leaked clips from the performance went viral on social media. Beyoncé's new vocal arrangements for "Drunk in Love" sparked vocal challenges online, especially on TikTok, in which fans attempted to recreate them. Some of the hashtags included #DrunkInLoveChallenge and #BeyonceInDubai.

== Controversies ==
Some journalists called into question the ethical implications of invited journalists' expenses being covered by Beyoncé. Kristal Brent Zook said that this was unethical because it defied the code of ethics set out by the Society of Professional Journalists. Yanick Rice Lamb, professor at Howard University, said that journalists should have denied the invitation, as they would be more inclined to cover the event positively because of the "once-in-a-lifetime experience" being offered to them.

Beyoncé was criticized for performing in Dubai due to the United Arab Emirates' (UAE) criminalization of homosexuality. According to the BBC, Beyoncé's most recent album Renaissance celebrated and honored black queer culture and paid tribute to "dance music that emerged out of the gay community." In an interview with BBC Newsbeat, music journalist Abigail Firth said that Renaissance was "indebted to LGBT culture" and the performance "seem[ed] like a really misguided choice." Human rights advocate Radha Stirling said that the concert sent people a "mixed message" of the United Arab Emirates as a "tolerant country" and "whitewash[ed]" the reality of its laws. She said "fans who follow their favorite singer to Dubai could face extreme human rights violations if accused of infringements of the UAE's strict homosexuality, offensive behavior and alcohol consumption laws." The controversy sparked a larger conversation as to whether or not popstars should perform in countries where homosexuality is illegal.

Some Emiratis in the LGBTQ community did not share negative sentiments. A queer Emirati woman spoke to Newsweek detailing surprise from her native circle, saying "the outrage comes from an international audience with little knowledge of the UAE and the type of events that periodically take place here." She referenced musicians who are LGBTQ or LGBTQ allies who have performed in the region before, such as Lady Gaga, Elton John, Adam Lambert and Boy George. Newsweek also featured a gay Emirati man who communicated that he viewed the real issue was the private nature of the performance, and expressed frustration at western notions of the Emiratis' experience in the UAE as a "super harsh" experience. In an interview with TMZ, Beyoncé's father Mathew Knowles defended the performance, saying that the concert "united a diverse audience", and that she gave and received respect to the UAE. He described the criticism as "narrow-minded" and referenced Beyoncé's history of support for the LGBTQ community, how she "would never deliberately hurt someone" and always stood for inclusiveness.

== Set list ==
The following songs were performed at the concert.

1. "At Last"
2. "XO"
3. "Flaws And All" (includes an instrumental interpolation of Camp Lo’s 1997 single "Luchini AKA This Is It")
4. "Ave Maria"
5. "Halo"
6. "Brown Skin Girl" (with Blue Ivy) (includes interpolated lyrics from India.Arie’s 2001 single "Brown Skin")
7. "Be Alive"
8. "Spirit of Rangeela" (performed by Firdaus Orchestra with a dance set from The Mayyas)
9. "Otherside"
10. "Bigger"
11. "Spirit"
12. "Freedom"
13. "I Care"
14. "Beautiful Liar"
15. "Batwanes Beek" (performed by Firdaus Orchestra with a dance set from The Mayyas)
16. "Crazy in Love" (containing elements of the Fifty Shades of Grey remix)
17. "Countdown"
18. "Naughty Girl" (containing elements of Jay-Z's 2002 Mundian To Bach Ke remix)
19. "Drunk in Love"
