= Atlantis Sanya =

Resort in Haitang, Sanya, China

Coordinates: 18°21′28″N 109°44′20″E

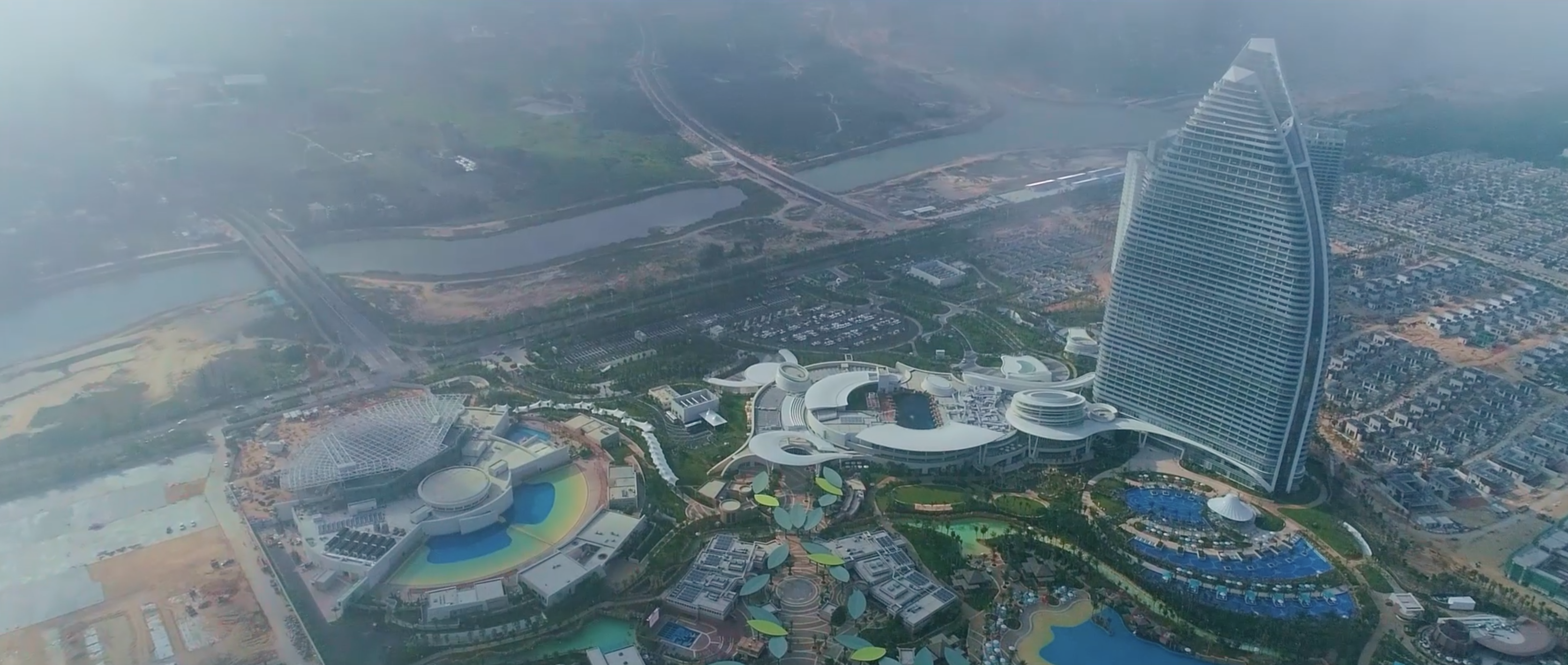
- Interactive map of the Atlantis Sanya area
- Hotel chain: Atlantis Resorts

General information
- Location: Sanya, Hainan, China
- Construction started: 2014
- Opening: April 28, 2018
- Owner: Fosun International
- Management: Kerzner International Resorts

Technical details
- Floor count: 48
- Floor area: 540,000 square metres

Design and construction
- Developer: Kerzner International Resorts

Other information
- Number of rooms: 1,314
- Number of suites: 154

Website
- www.atlantissanya.com

Atlantis Sanya is an ocean-themed luxury hotel and resort in Sanya, China.

== History ==
Kerzner International Resorts opened Atlantis Sanya on April 28, 2018, after nearly four years of construction. It became the third resort they opened and their first in China. The resort sits along Haitang Bay and occupies 540,000 square metres of land. It cost $1.74 billion to build the resort. The resort is one of multiple new hotels to open around Hainan as the island attempts to draw more visitors from abroad.

In 2024, Fosun International was exploring selling its stake in the property.

== Features and attractions ==
The hotel is 48 stories tall and features 1,314 guest rooms. 154 of these guest rooms are suites. It has 21 restaurants, bars and lounges. Atlantis features retail space at an attached shopping mall called Shopping at the Avenues. There is also convention space, a fitness center, spas, pools as well as beach access.

Atlantis Sanya is home to an open-air aquariums, similar to other properties operated by Atlantis Resorts. The aquarium features over 270 different species of marine life. Much like other properties operated by Atlantis Resorts, the property also features a large water park. In addition, the resort features an 1,800-seat theater for performances.

== Gallery ==
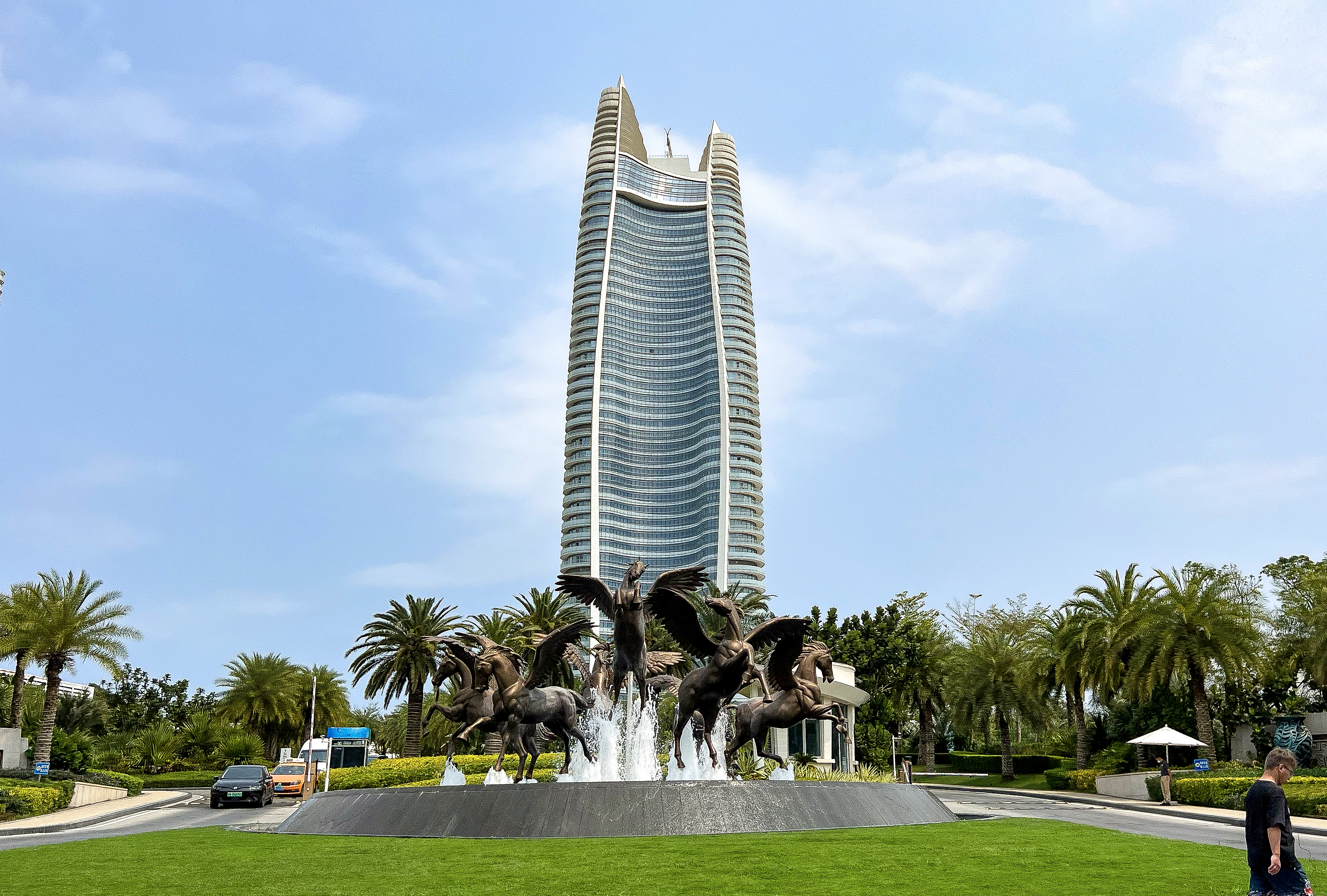
View of the resort tower

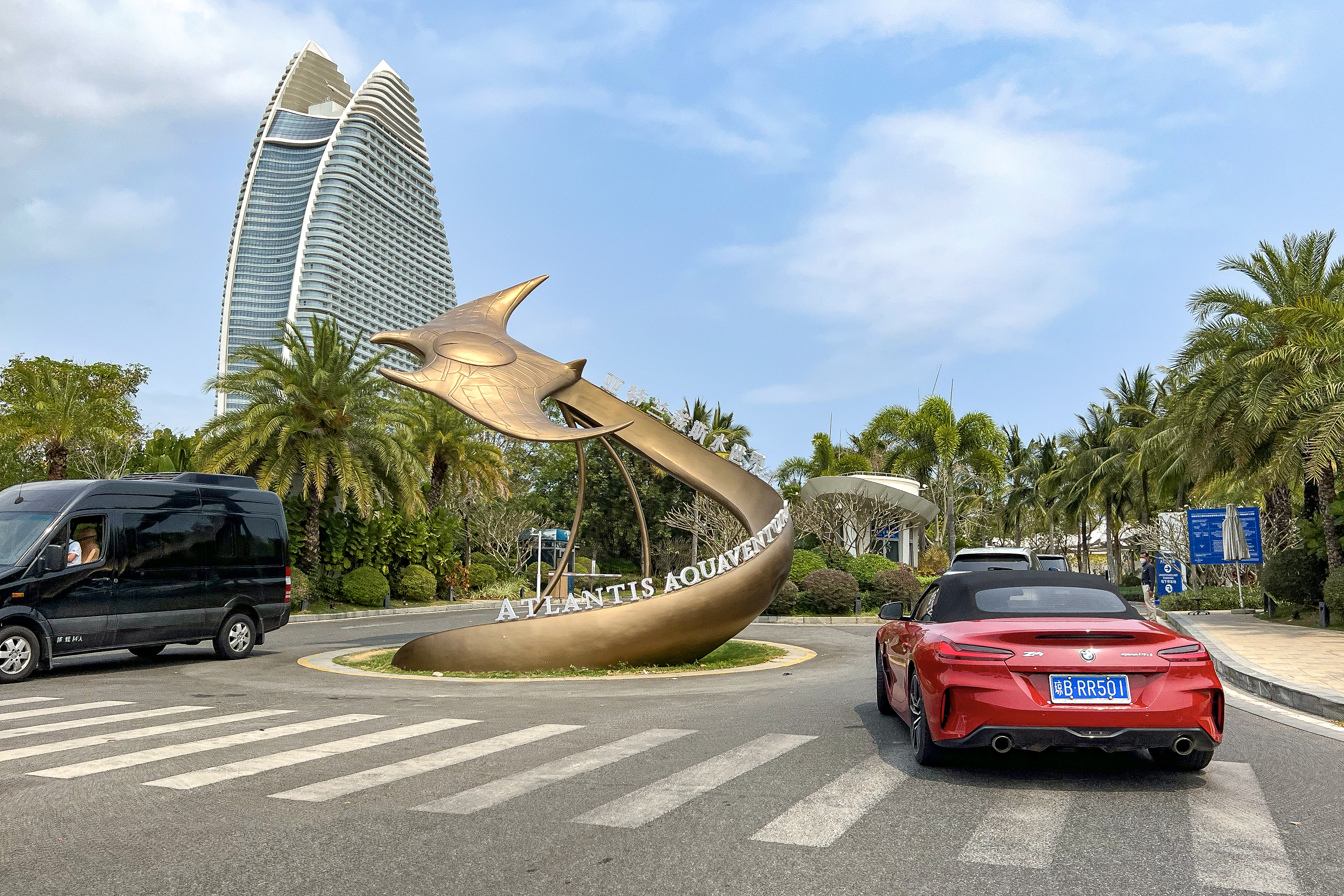
Entrance to the resort

== See also ==
- Atlantis Paradise Island
- Atlantis The Royal, Dubai
- Atlantis, The Palm
- Atlantis Resorts
