= María Murillo =

María Murillo may refer to:

- María Lucelly Murillo (born 1991), Colombian javelin thrower
- María Murillo (footballer) (born 1996), Panamanian footballer
- María Fernanda Murillo (born 1999), Colombian high jumper
- María Murillo (sprinter) (born 1997), Costa Rican sprinter at the 2016 NACAC Under-23 Championships
- María Murillo, also known as María Toto (1945–2026), Panamanian boxing trainer

== See also ==
- Mario Murillo
