= Atlantis The Royal, Dubai =

Luxury hotel resort in Dubai

Coordinates: 25°08′17″N 55°07′40″E

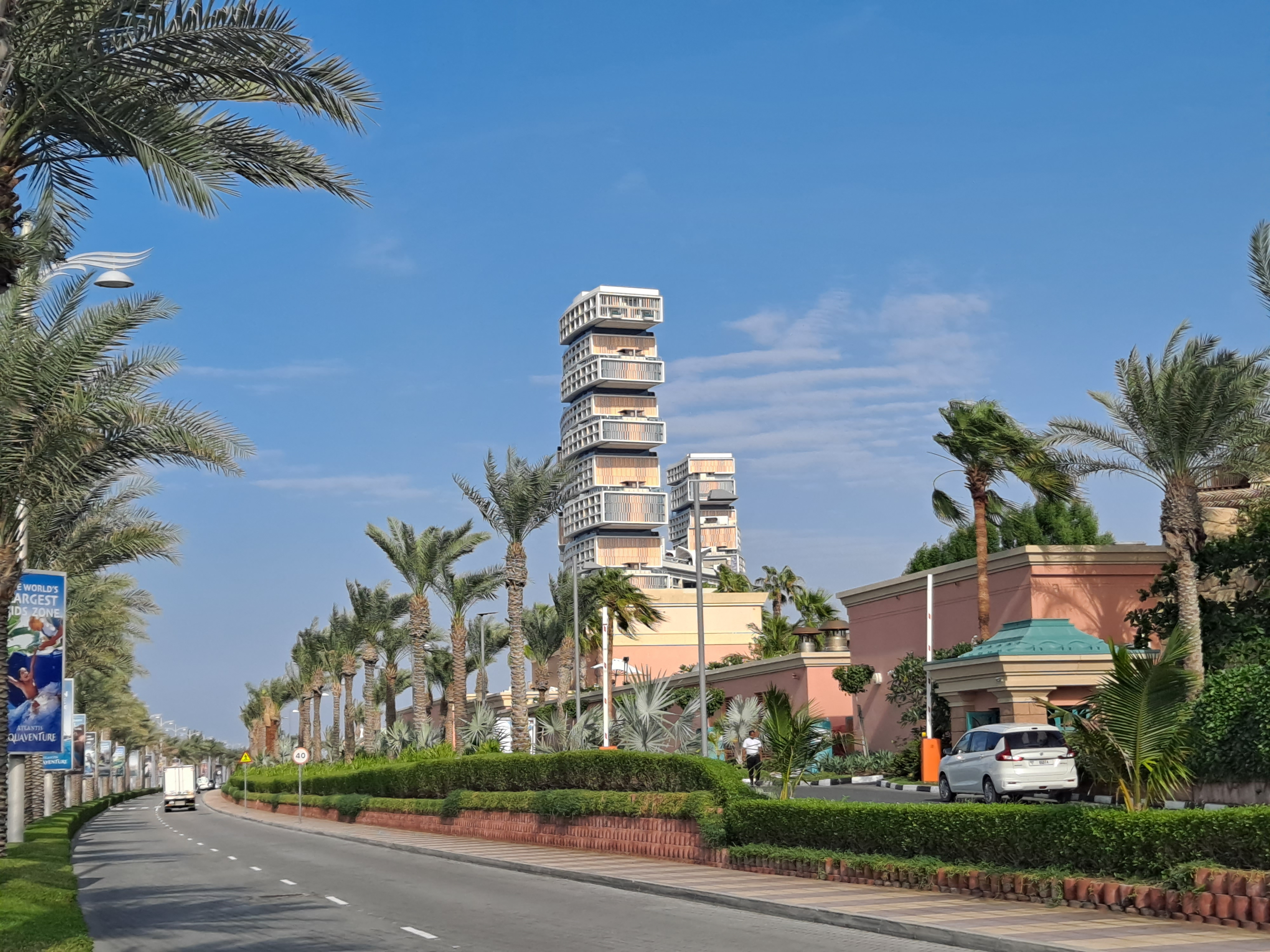
- Interactive map of the Atlantis The Royal, Dubai area
- Hotel chain: Atlantis The Palm, Dubai

General information
- Location: Palm Jumeirah, Dubai, United Arab Emirates
- Construction started: 2016
- Opening: February 10, 2023
- Operator: Atlantis Resorts

Height
- Height: 193 m (633 ft)

Technical details
- Floor count: 43

Design and construction
- Architect: Kohn Pedersen Fox
- Developer: Kerzner International Resorts
- Main contractor: Besix

Other information
- Number of rooms: 760
- Number of suites: Suites (Junior Sky View, Sky Terrace, Family Terrace, Sky Pool Villa); Penthouses (Palmscape, Skyscape, The Horizon Penthouse, Panoramic Penthouse, The Royal Mansion)

Website
- atlantis.com/atlantis-the-royal

Atlantis The Royal, Dubai is a hotel resort at the Palm Jumeirah, Dubai in the United Arab Emirates. The 760 room, 16 restaurant resort has the world's largest jellyfish aquarium. Out of the 102 VIP suites, 44 have their own private pools. Outdoor areas remain cooled 10 months out of the year using shades, pools, plants, and ornamental fountains. Atlantis the Royal is one of the most expensive hotels in the world, where the price of the "Royal Mansion" suite exceeds $100,000 per night.

== Opening ==
Atlantis The Royal was originally set to open in October 2022 but was rescheduled for 2023. On December 23, 2022, British tabloid newspaper The Sun broke the story that Beyoncé would give an hour-long performance for The Royal on January 21 for more than $24 million, making the concert the highest-paid private performance in history. Various publications were sent invites to a weekend in Dubai with courtesy expense and transport and promised an unspecified "once-in-a-lifetime" performance. On January 18, three days before the concert, fans reported hearing soundchecks for several of Beyoncé's songs outside the hotel. The resort became open to the public and available for reservation on February 10, 2023, and the launch event lasted three days. Journalists, celebrities, and influencers were invited, given accommodation at the hotel and given first class airfare on Emirates.

== Restaurants and Bars ==
- Ariana’s Persian Kitchen (Ariana Bundy)
- Carbone
- Dinner by Heston Blumenthal
- Estiatorio Milos Dubai
- La Mar Dubai by Gastón Acurio
- Ling Ling Dubai
- Nobu By The Beach
- Cloud 22
- Elements
- The Royal Pool
- Gastronomy
- Malibu 90265
- House of Desserts
- Royal Club Sea Lounge Christophe Devoille
- The Royal Tearoom

== Gallery ==
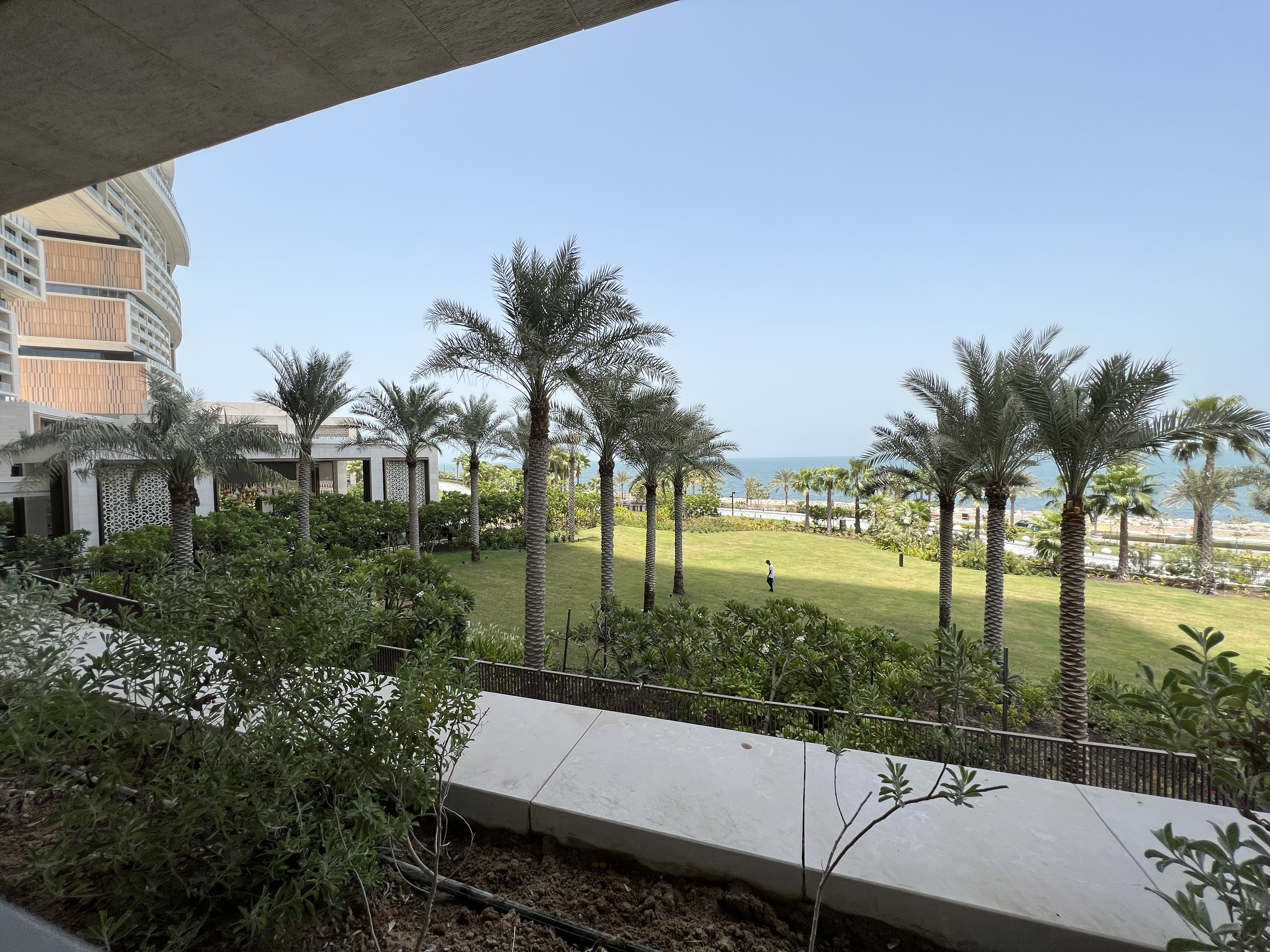
Atlantis The Royal, Dubai

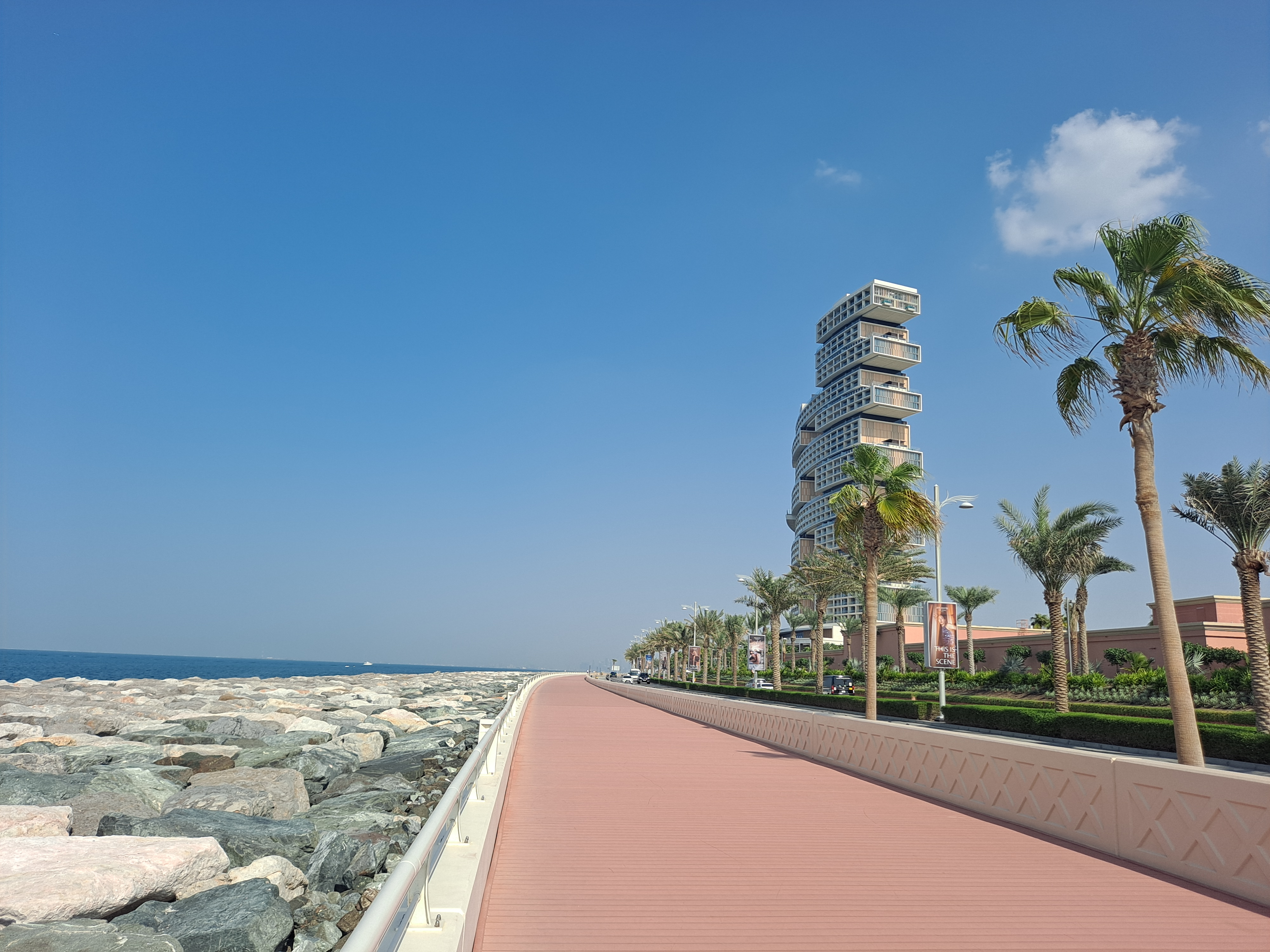
As seen from the beach

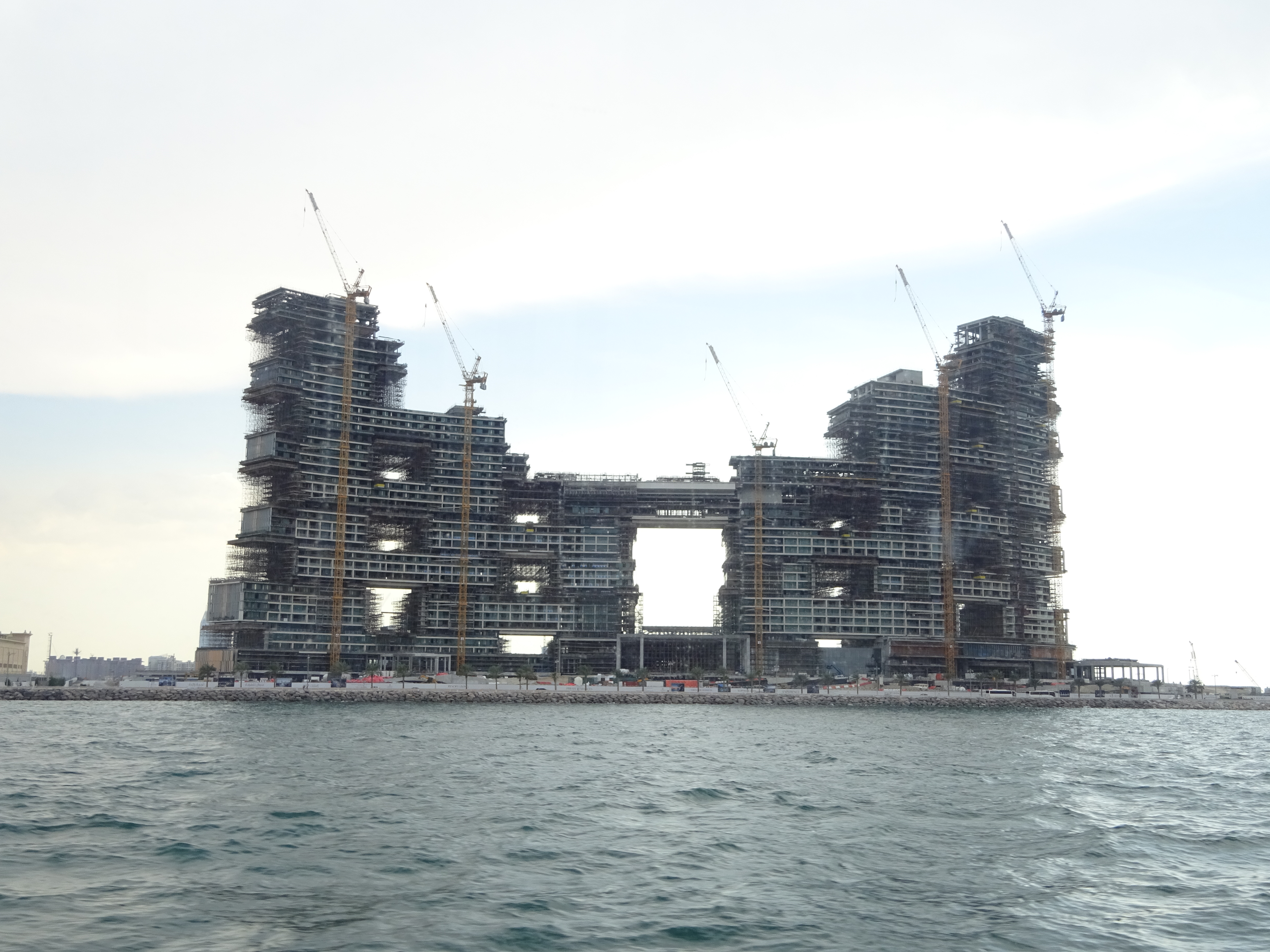
Construction of hotel in 2019

== See also ==
- Beyoncé 2023 Dubai performance
- Dubai World
- Atlantis, The Palm
- List of hotels in Dubai
- Atlantis Paradise Island – similar looking hotel by Sol Kerzner
- Atlantis Sanya
- Atlantis Resorts
