= Atlantis Resorts =

International resort subsidiary

Former Logo (Pre 2021)

Atlantis Resorts, a subsidiary of Kerzner International, is a resort company that was created to operate the Atlantis resorts in Dubai (United Arab Emirates), and Sanya (China). Kerzner operates three resorts that include Atlantis The Palm, Dubai; Atlantis Sanya, China; and Atlantis The Royal, Dubai. The Atlantis Paradise Island resort in the Bahamas is no longer owned or operated by Kerzner and is now owned by Brookfield Asset Management LLC and operated by Marriott International's Autograph Collection Hotels.

== Aquaventure ==
Aquaventure is a large water park with large focus on theming and some attractions not typically found at local water parks. A concept originally introduced for the expansion to the Paradise Island resort complex, Aquaventure is now located at both resorts. The main features of both complexes are The Current, a lazy river-water raft ride hybrid, and the Mayan temple slide tower.

== The resorts ==
- Atlantis Paradise Island, Nassau, Bahamas
- Atlantis The Palm, Dubai
- Atlantis Sanya, China
- Atlantis The Royal, Dubai
- Atlantis Ko Olina Resort, Hawaii, United States (cancelled)
