= Mario A. Murillo =

American journalist

Mario A. Murillo is an American journalist, author, and teacher. He has worked in commercial, public, and community radio since 1986. His experience includes previously hosting and producing Wakeup Call on WBAI, a Pacifica-owned station in New York. Professor of Communication and Latin American Studies at Hofstra University, Murillo is also the author of Colombia and the United States: War, Unrest, and Destabilization and Islands of Resistance: Puerto Rico, Vieques and U.S. Policy.

His father was born in Subachoque, Cundinamarca, outside of Bogotá, Colombia, and his mother was from Moca, Puerto Rico. Mario was born in New York City.

He is Professor of Communication and Latin American Studies at Hofstra University, and is currently the Vice Dean of The Lawrence Herbert School of Communication. He teaches courses in Radio Journalism and Production, Media Studies, Latin American Studies and Peace Studies. A media scholar and award-winning journalist, he is an active member of the Advisory Boards of both Hofstra's Center for Civic Engagement and the center for "Race," Culture and Social Justice. In his over 30-years in radio he has served as Program Director, director of Public Affairs programming, and a host and producer at WBAI Pacifica Radio in New York, was a feature correspondent for NPR's Latino USA, and served as a regular guest host on WNYC New York Public Radio. He currently hosts a bi-weekly live radio show “Rumba Therapy” on WIOX Community Radio in Roxbury, in the Central Catskills region of New York, (WIOXRadio.org or 91.3FM), and is a faculty advisor and producer at WRHU 88.7FM, Hofstra University's award-winning, student-run, community-licensed radio station.

He is the author of Colombia and the United States: War, Unrest and Destabilization (Seven Stories, 2004), and Islands of Resistance: Puerto Rico, Vieques and U.S. Policy (Seven Stories, 2001), and has written and reported extensively about Latin America for a number of publications and journals. Much of his work has focused on U.S. policy in Latin America, and he has dedicated considerable time on grassroots community radio projects in rural communities in Colombia. He was a 2008-2009 Fulbright Scholar in Colombia, where he worked in the Universidad Pontificia la Javeriana in Bogotá in its department of social communication.

As a journalist, radio documentarian, writer and researcher, he has focused much of his attention on the cultural and social role public interest, community-oriented radio plays in local and national contexts, and considers citizen's media to be a fundamental tool of cultural affirmation, artistic expression, civic engagement, and political participation.

Murillo has a BA in Political Science and Journalism from New York University, and an MA, also from NYU, in Media Ecology.
