= Howard Kerzner =

South African businessman

Howard Brett Kerzner
- Born: January 27, 1964; Durban, South Africa
- Died: October 11, 2006 (aged 42); Sosúa, Dominican Republic
- Other name: Butch
- Education: Stanford University
- Occupation: Businessman
- Employer: Kerzner International
- Father: Sol Kerzner

Howard 'Butch' Kerzner was a South African businessman and the son of Sol Kerzner.

He was born in Durban and went to school in Johannesburg. He was sent to Stanford University where he completed a master's degree in business administration.

He later joined his father's business, Kerzner International, and became its CEO in 2003, leading it on an expansion drive. Donald Trump, a hotelier, called him "a great visionary".

He was killed in a helicopter crash in the Dominican Republic while surveying sites for new resorts.
