= Atlantis Paradise Island =

Ocean-themed resort in the Bahamas

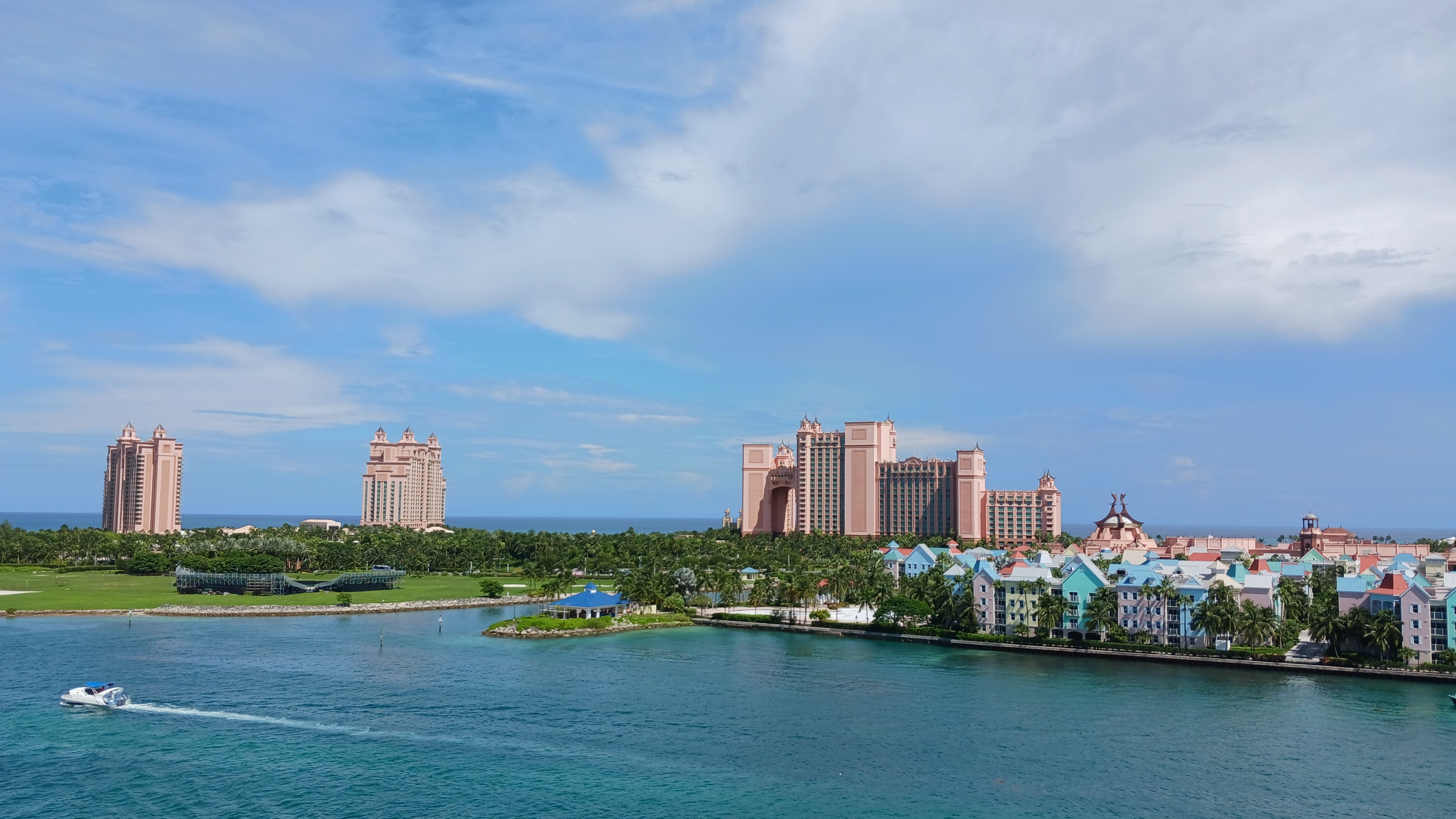
- The Atlantis Paradise Island complex from the Sir Sidney Poitier Bridge
- Interactive map of Atlantis Paradise Island
- Location: Paradise Island, Bahamas; 25°5′6″N 77°19′15″W
- Opened: 1968 (as Paradise Island Hotel and Casino); December 11, 1998 (as Atlantis Paradise Island)
- No. of rooms: 3,805
- Gaming space: 60,000 sq ft (5,600 m^{2})
- Signature attractions: Aquaventure Waterpark
- Casino type: Land-based
- Owner: Brookfield Asset Management
- Architect: HKS inc
- Website: atlantisbahamas.com

Atlantis Paradise Island is an ocean-themed casino resort located on Paradise Island in the Bahamas. The resort spans 154-acre (62 ha) which includes a waterpark, marine habitat, and other recreational facilities. It is built around the Aquaventure waterscape and features multiple hotel towers, including The Royal, Coral, Cove, and Reef Towers.

The resort incorporates the legend of Atlantis into its design, from the ceiling murals in the foyer to Plato's bar, named after the philosopher who first described the lost city. The resort features numerous decorative elements, including glass sculptures by American artist Dale Chihuly in the casino and indoor waterfalls and fountains near the foyer.

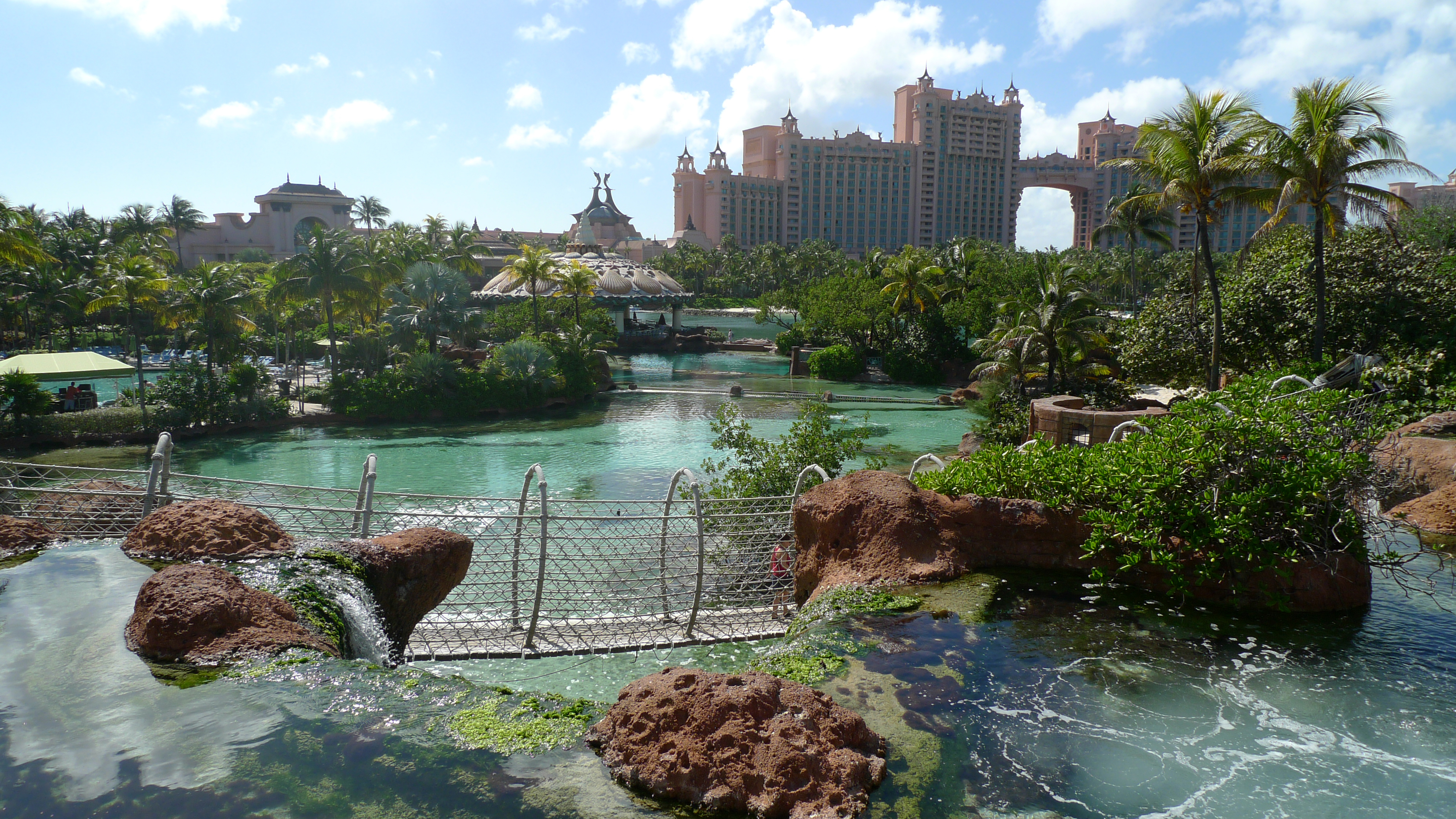
Royal Towers, Atlantis Paradise Island

== History ==
The site was initially developed as part of the Paradise Island Hotel and Casino, which opened in 1968 under the ownership of Resorts International, a company later acquired by television host and businessman Merv Griffin. Before Griffin's acquisition, Donald Trump held a majority stake in Resorts International and later sold it to Griffin, retaining only certain assets, such as the Trump Taj Mahal in Atlantic City.

In 1994, South African hotelier Sol Kerzner purchased the property through Kerzner International Limited. Following renovations and expansions, the resort was rebranded as Atlantis Paradise Island, with the construction of the Royal Towers marking the official opening on December 11, 1998. The Coral Towers and Beach Tower were also refurbished to align with the resort's Atlantis city theme.

In 2007, additional expansions included The Cove, a 600-suite luxury tower that opened in March, and The Reef Atlantis, which opened later that year in December.

In 2014, Atlantis became part of Marriott International's Autograph Collection, allowing guests to earn and redeem points through Marriott Bonvoy. As of 2023, the resort is owned and operated by Brookfield Asset Management.

Around 2021, the Beach tower was closed and bought by Pharrell Williams, who will redevelop it into his own hotel called Somewhere Else.

In 2024, Atlantis Paradise Island was renovated, including updates to The Royal, the Atlantis Casino, and new dining and retail options. The Royal's guest rooms have been redesigned with a focus on Bahamian aesthetics, while the casino has received new carpeting, lighting, and the reinstallation of Dale Chihuly glass sculptures. New dining and retail offerings include Bar Sol, Paranza, Silan, Perch, the Caribbean's first Shake Shack, FIELDTRIP, Cartier, and Thistle.

== Facilities and attractions ==
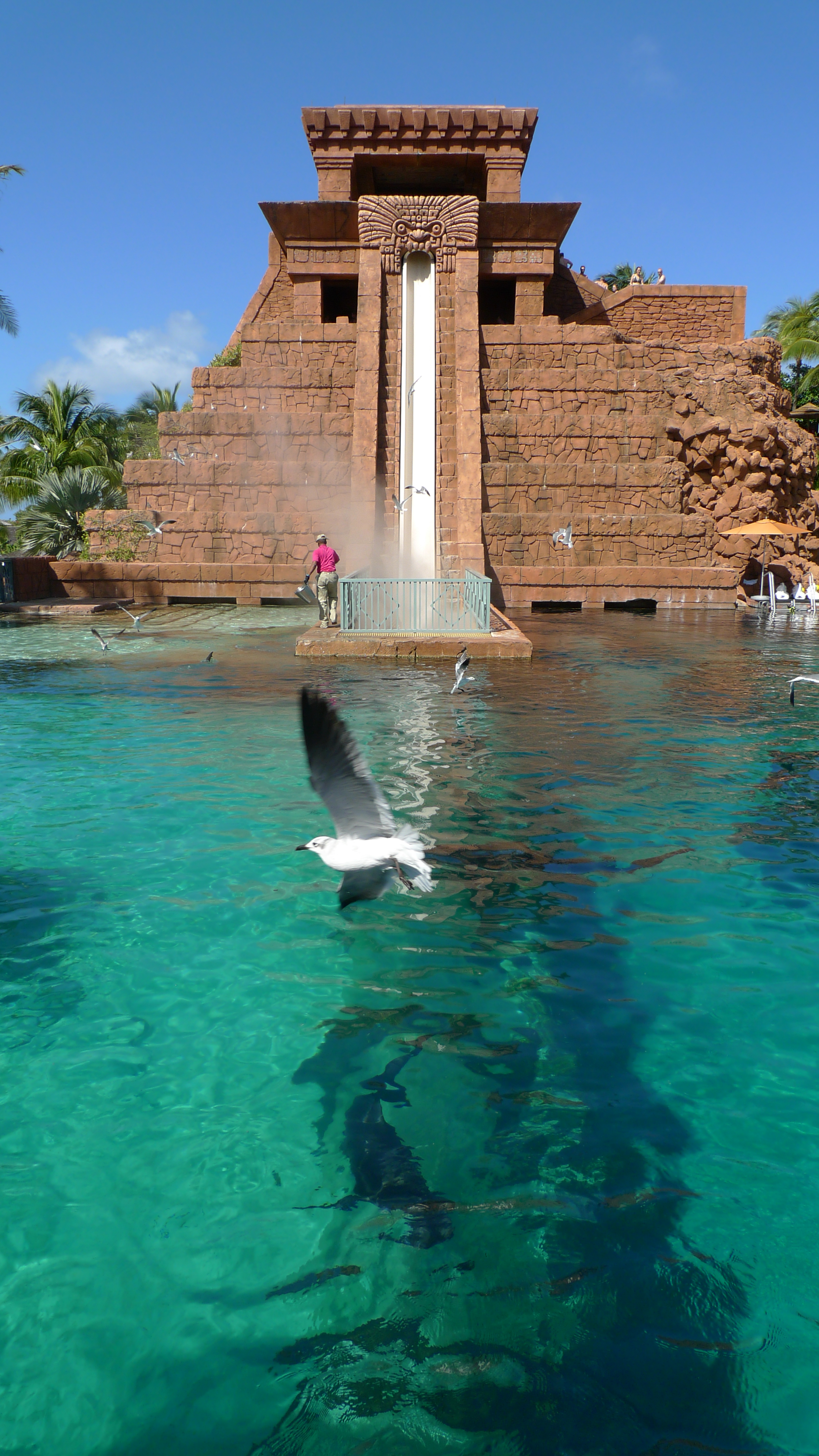
Mayan Leap of Faith water slide

Atlantis Paradise Island features multiple water-based attractions, including the Aquaventure Waterpark, a 154-acre water park featuring numerous water slides, river rides, and swimming pools. The waterpark also boasts five miles of white sand beaches.

The resort is also home to the largest open-air marine habitat in the world. This habitat houses over 65,000 aquatic animals from 250 species, including dolphins, sharks, sawfish, and stingrays. The resort also includes a Dolphin Cay which is a marine conservation and education center. It offers visitors the opportunity to learn about marine life and interact with dolphins in a controlled environment.

Additional facilities include a 7,100-yard golf course and a marina designed to accommodate yachts. The resort offers various dining options, entertainment venues, and retail outlets.

The resort has five hotels, and over 20 varied restaurants including Nobu and Paranza.

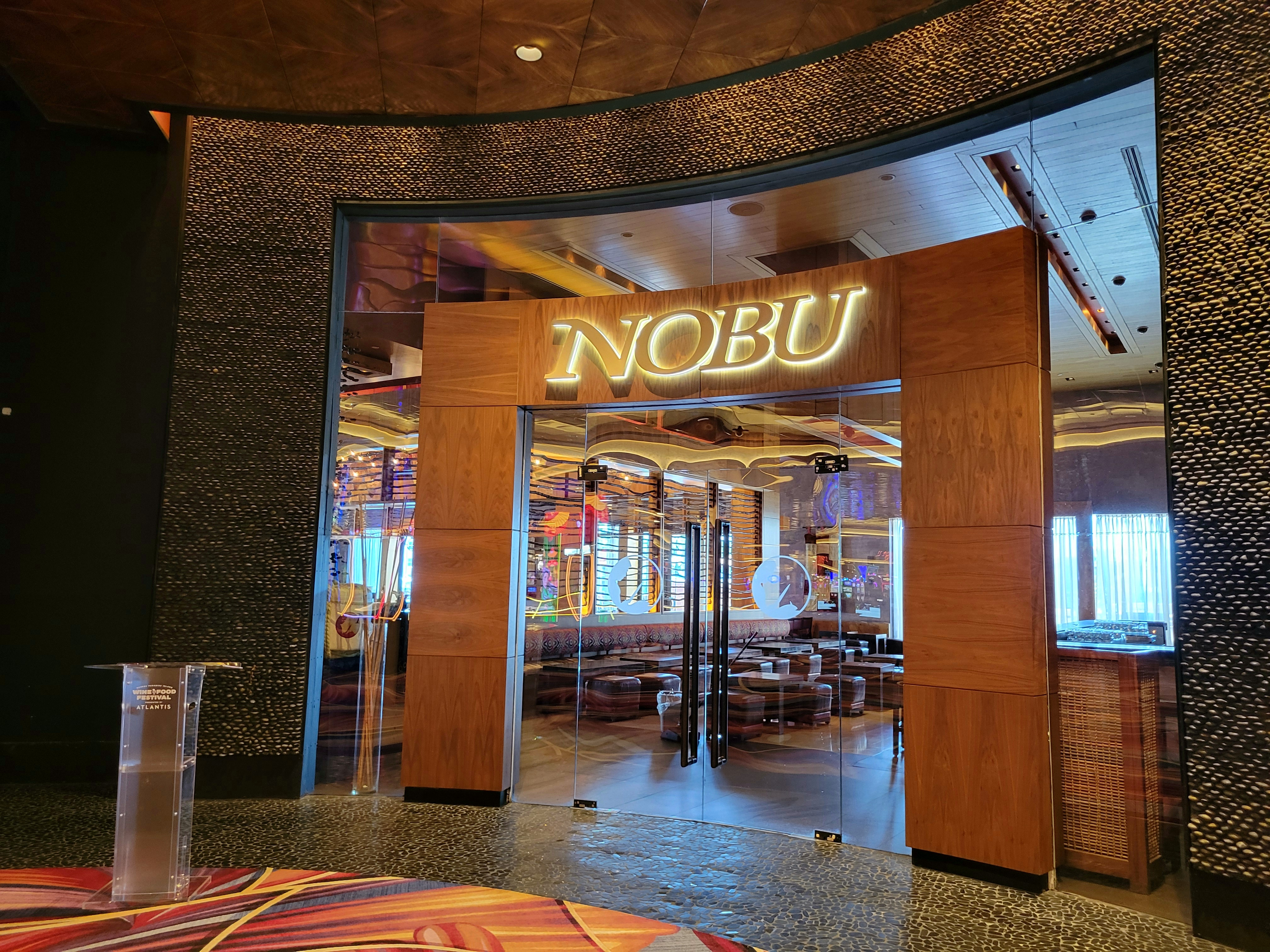
Nobu restaurant

=== Casino ===
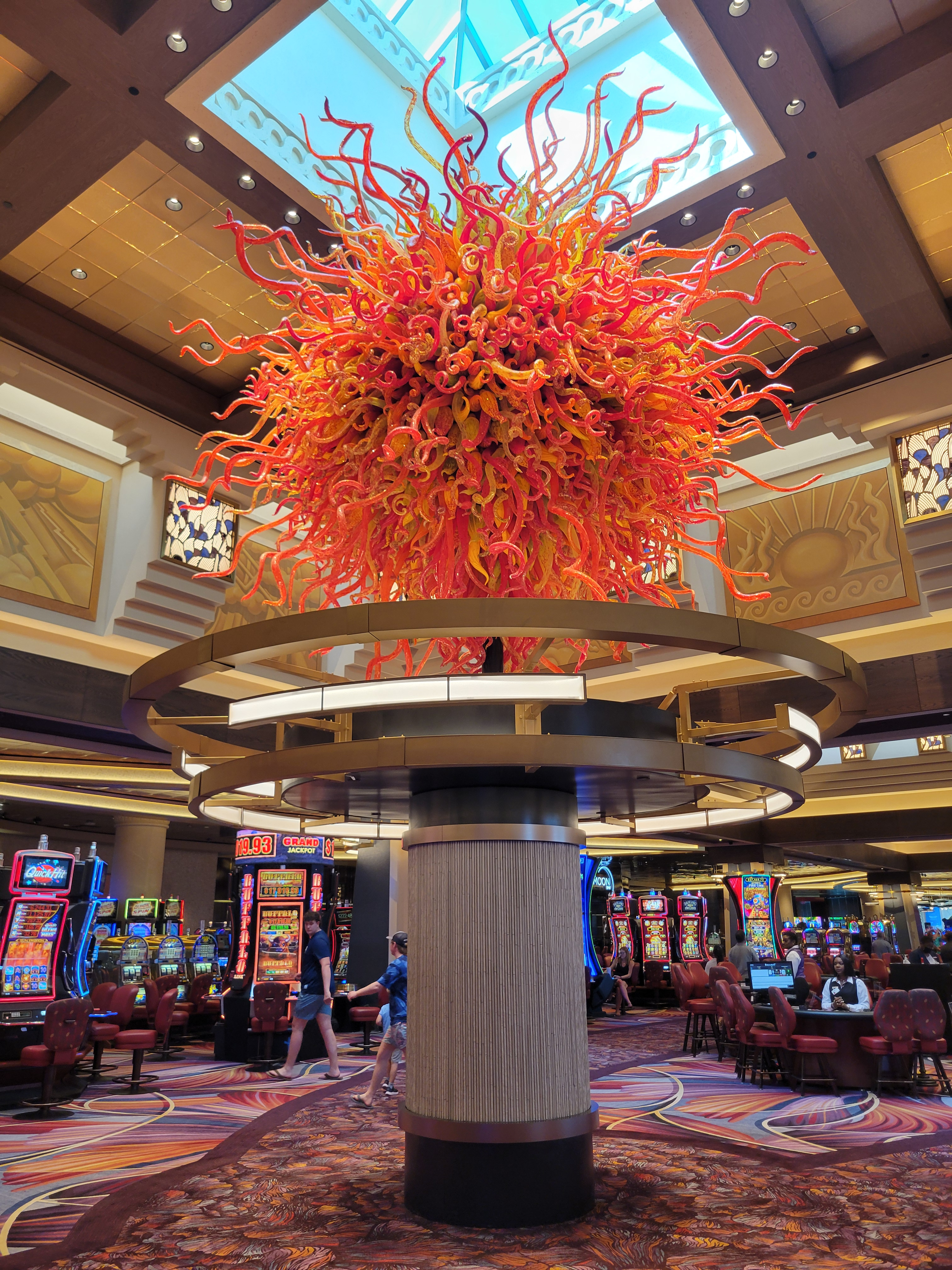
Inside the casino

The resort features a 60,000 square foot casino, which is one of the largest in the Caribbean. It includes 85 table games and over 700 slot machines.

== Atlantis Blue Project Foundation ==
Atlantis Paradise Island is involved in marine conservation efforts through the Atlantis Blue Project Foundation (ABPF), a 501(c)(3) organization nonprofit organization established in 2005. The ABPF focuses on preserving marine species and their habitats in the Bahamas and the Caribbean. The foundation's work extends beyond the resort's Dolphin Cay, encompassing broader environmental stewardship and ocean conservation initiatives. One significant project is the establishment of the Bahamas' first coral gene bank, aimed at combating Stony coral tissue loss disease, a threat to coral reefs in the region and globally.

== See also ==
- Atlantis, The Palm
- Atlantis The Royal, Dubai
- Atlantis Sanya
- Atlantis Resorts
- List of largest hotels
- List of integrated resorts

| Preceded by Crown Convention Center, Vietnam | Miss Universe Venue; 2009 | Succeeded by Mandalay Bay Events Center, United States |
| Preceded by Pasadena Civic Auditorium, California | Miss Teen USA Venue; 2008–2015 | Succeeded by The Venetian Las Vegas, Nevada |
