= Kristal Brent Zook =

American journalist

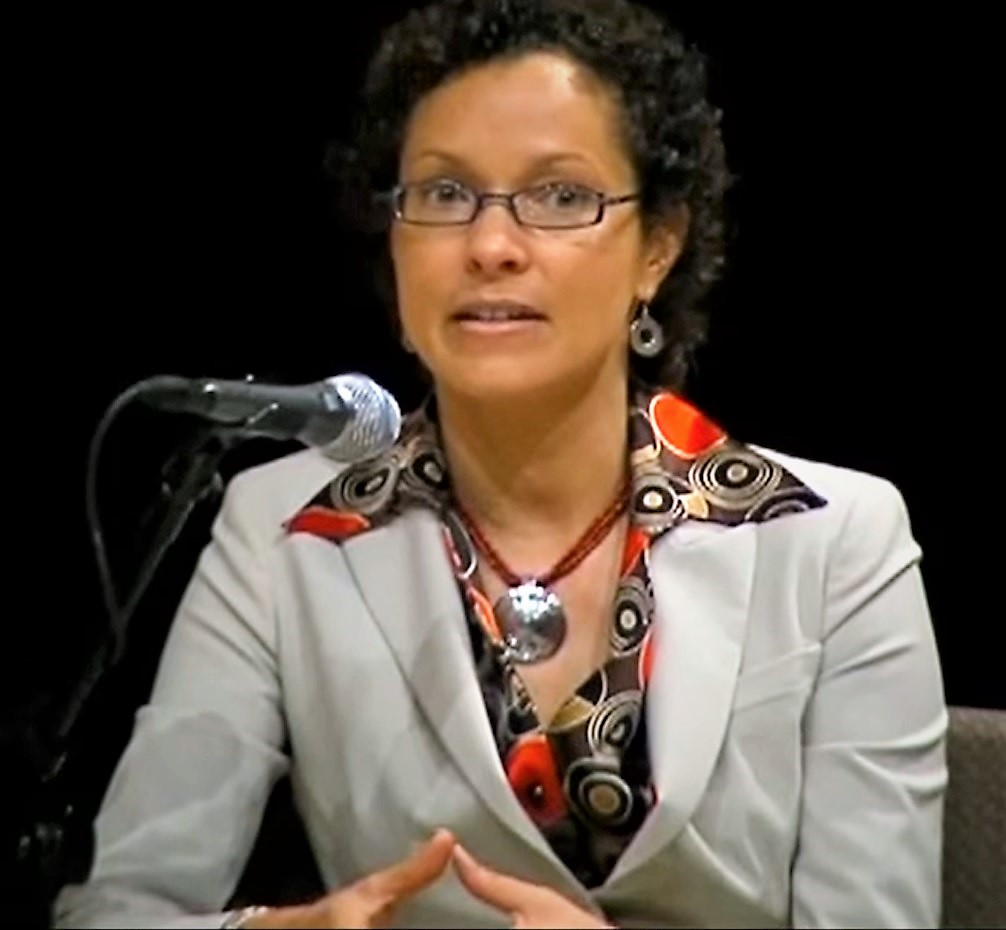
- Kristal speaking at the Brooklyn Museum in 2011
- Born: 1961; Los Angeles, CA
- Occupation(s): Journalist and academic, The Lawrence Herbert School of Communication
- Known for: Journalism

Kristal Brent Zook is an American journalist who focuses on race and gender. She is also a professor of journalism, media studies, and public relations at The Lawrence Herbert School of Communication at Hofstra University.

== Life ==
Zook received her Ph.D. from the University of California, Santa Cruz in 1994. Before teaching at Hofstra, she taught at Columbia University.

Zook is a former contributing writer for The Washington Post and Essence, and has contributed commentary to a variety of media outlets including CNN, NPR, BET, MSNBC, and MTV. She focuses on how the media portrays black people and has written books on the topic, Color by Fox and I See Black People. She also speaks on a variety of subjects including race, gender, multiracial identity, and social justice issues.

== Bibliography ==
Title	Year	Category	ISBN
Color by Fox: The Fox Network and the Revolution in Black Television	1999	Nonfiction	978-0195105483
Black Women's Lives: Stories of Pain and Power	2006	Nonfiction	978-1560257905
I See Black People: The Rise and Fall of African American-Owned Television and Radio	2008	Nonfiction	978-1560259992
