= Atlantis, The Palm =

Luxury hotel resort in Dubai

- Interactive map of the Atlantis, The Palm area
- Hotel chain: Atlantis, The Palm

General information
- Location: Jumeirah Palm, Dubai
- Construction started: 2006
- Opening: September 24, 2008
- Operator: Kerzner International Resorts

Height
- Height: 93.0 m (305.1 ft)

Technical details
- Floor count: 22

Design and construction
- Developer: Kerzner International Resorts

Other information
- Number of rooms: 1,544
- Number of suites: Suites (Regal, Terrace, Executive); Super Suites (Royal Bridge, Grand Atlantis, Underwater, Presidential)

Website
- www.atlantis.com/dubai/atlantis-the-palm

Atlantis, The Palm is a luxury hotel resort located at the apex of the Palm Jumeirah in the United Arab Emirates. It was the first resort to be built on the island and is themed on the myth of Atlantis but includes distinct Arabian elements. The resort opened on September 24, 2008 as a joint venture between Kerzner International Holdings Limited and Istithmar World.

== Hotel ==
The 1,544 room nautically themed resort has two accommodation wings, consisting of the East and the West Tower. It is complemented by the Aquaventure water park and the Lost Chambers Aquarium, home to over 65,000 marine animals. Atlantis, The Palm is also known as the culinary destination in the region where guests can take their pick from a collection of 35 world-renowned restaurants including Bread Street Kitchen & Bar, Street Pizza, Hakkasan, Nobu, En Fuego, Seafire Steakhouse & Bar and the award-winning underwater restaurant, Ossiano. Atlantis, The Palm is one of three Atlantis resorts with one being located in Paradise Island, Bahamas, and the other being located in China.

== Underwater rooms ==
The Poseidon and Neptune Underwater Suites at Atlantis The Palm are two of only a tiny handful of underwater hotel rooms around the world, and regularly appear in lists of the world's most unique accommodation.

Measuring 165 m^{2} (1,780 sq ft) in total, the upper, entrance floor is at ground level while the master bedroom and en-suite bathroom are submerged. The almost floor to ceiling windows in both the bedroom and bathroom face out on to the resort's Ambassador Lagoon, home to a multitude of exotic sea creatures. The floor-to-ceiling windows includes 65,000 marine animal aquarium in Dubai including sharks and rays.

== Development ==
Atlantis The Palm, opened on the 24th of September 2008 as a joint venture between Kerzner International Holdings Limited and Istithmar World. In April 2012, Istithmar World acquired Kerzner's 50-percent stake in the property for $250 million USD. The property continues to be managed by Kerzner International Resorts. The conceptual design architects were Northpoint-South Africa. The architect of record was design firm Wimberly, Allison, Tong and Goo (WATG) an international firm specializing in Luxury Hotels. The principal contract for the project was awarded to Laing O'Rourke, a multinational construction firm based in the United Kingdom. Laing O'Rourke was responsible for the design and construction phases of the 23-story hotel and water park.

== Launch ==
The hotel was officially opened on the 24th of September 2008.

Days before the opening ceremony, the hotel's grand lobby caught fire and became engulfed in flames which caused concern over the hotel's opening. Work was done to repair the damage caused and the hotel opened on time.

As part of the opening, a light show of moving images was illuminated onto the hotel. 100,000 fireworks, around seven times the amount that were used for the opening ceremony of the 2008 Beijing Olympics, were let off, lasting 15 minutes. The display of fireworks across the full 5 km (3.1 mi) stretch of The Palm lit up the entire island and Atlantis. Custom-made shells shipped in from across the globe created a light spectacle taking off from the 716 firing locations around the island, including 400 balconies at the resort. Display creator Fireworks by Grucci claims the display set a new world record, but records curator Guinness World Records has yet to announce the status. The launch party costed an estimated £15m in total, with Kylie Minogue earning £2m for a 60-minute performance for the hotel's 2,000 guests.

== Reception ==
The Telegraph gave the hotel an 8/10, commending the underwater theme and facilities available. A 2024 review by The Sunday Times gave the hotel a score of 9/10, complimenting the architecture and appeal to all age groups Atlantis had to offer.

=== Controversy ===
In October 2007, the hotel received a shipment of 28 bottlenose dolphins from the Solomon Islands, to be used as part of their aquarium exhibit, called Dolphin Bay. The move was decried by several environmental groups, particularly for the fact that the export of dolphins had earlier been banned by the Solomon Islands government (after a similar controversial shipment to Mexico). Hotel managers have said that though the dolphins are being trained to interact with visitors, they will not appear in any sort of show or circus-like performance. They have also stated that the health of the dolphins is paramount; because the bottlenose is not an endangered species, their shipment did not pose a problem. The deal was done with the approval of the United Arab Emirates and Solomon Island governments, through the company Solomon Islands Marine Mammal Education Centre and Exporters Limited (who had overturned the earlier ban in court). The amount of money paid for the dolphins has not been disclosed.

The hotel faced controversy in 2010 following the captivity of a whale shark, nicknamed Sammy, in an aquarium exhibit for 18 months. The female juvenile was caught off a coast in Jebel Ali in August 2008 after appearing in distress. At the time, whale sharks were listed in appendix 2 of CITES, stipulating that they can "only be held for scientific purposes provided that it does not harm the survival of the species". The captivity sparked outrage among animal rights groups and activists, including PETA and actress Pamela Anderson. Gulf News launched a campaign with thousands of supporters calling for the release of the shark. Atlantis would release a press release, stating:

"After several months of planning, Atlantis, The Palm in Dubai has returned a female whale shark to the waters of the Persian Gulf from where she was rescued. The Atlantis Fish Husbandry Team utilised their experience and skill to save the animal in compliance with all CITIES regulations."

Ali Bin Saqr Al Suwaidi, president and founder of the Emirates Marine Environment Group, another group involved in the campaign, confirmed the shark was set to be released. Scepticism surrounding the release persisted afterwards due to a lack of images being circulated, with Steve Kaiser, vice president of Marine Science and Engineering at Atlantis, denying the claims of Sammy still being held in captivity.

== Gallery ==
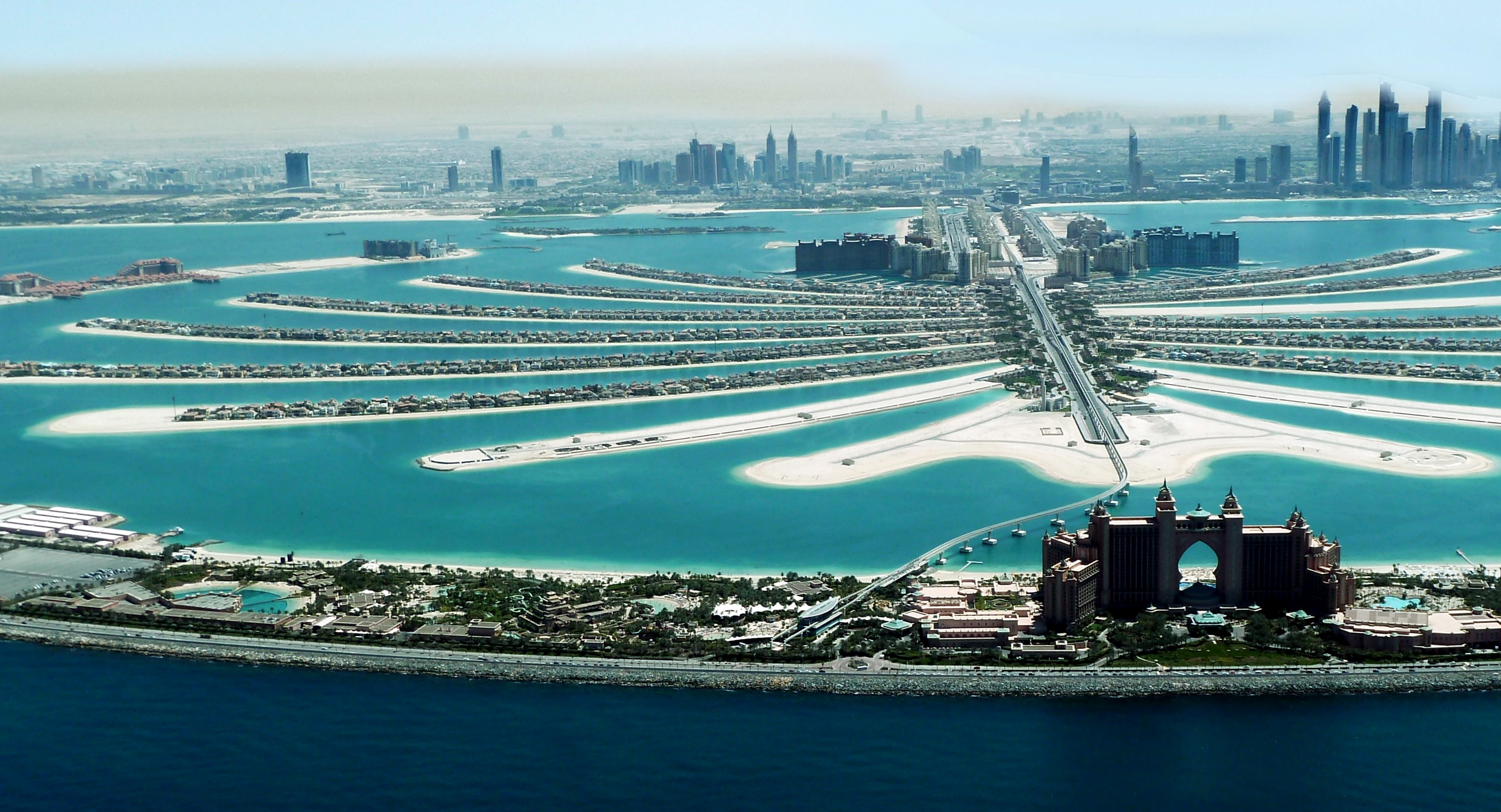
Aerial view of Atlantis The Palm and nearby artificial islands

Aerial view

Daytime exterior view

Atlantis The Palm at night

Lobby Lounge

Lobby Corridor

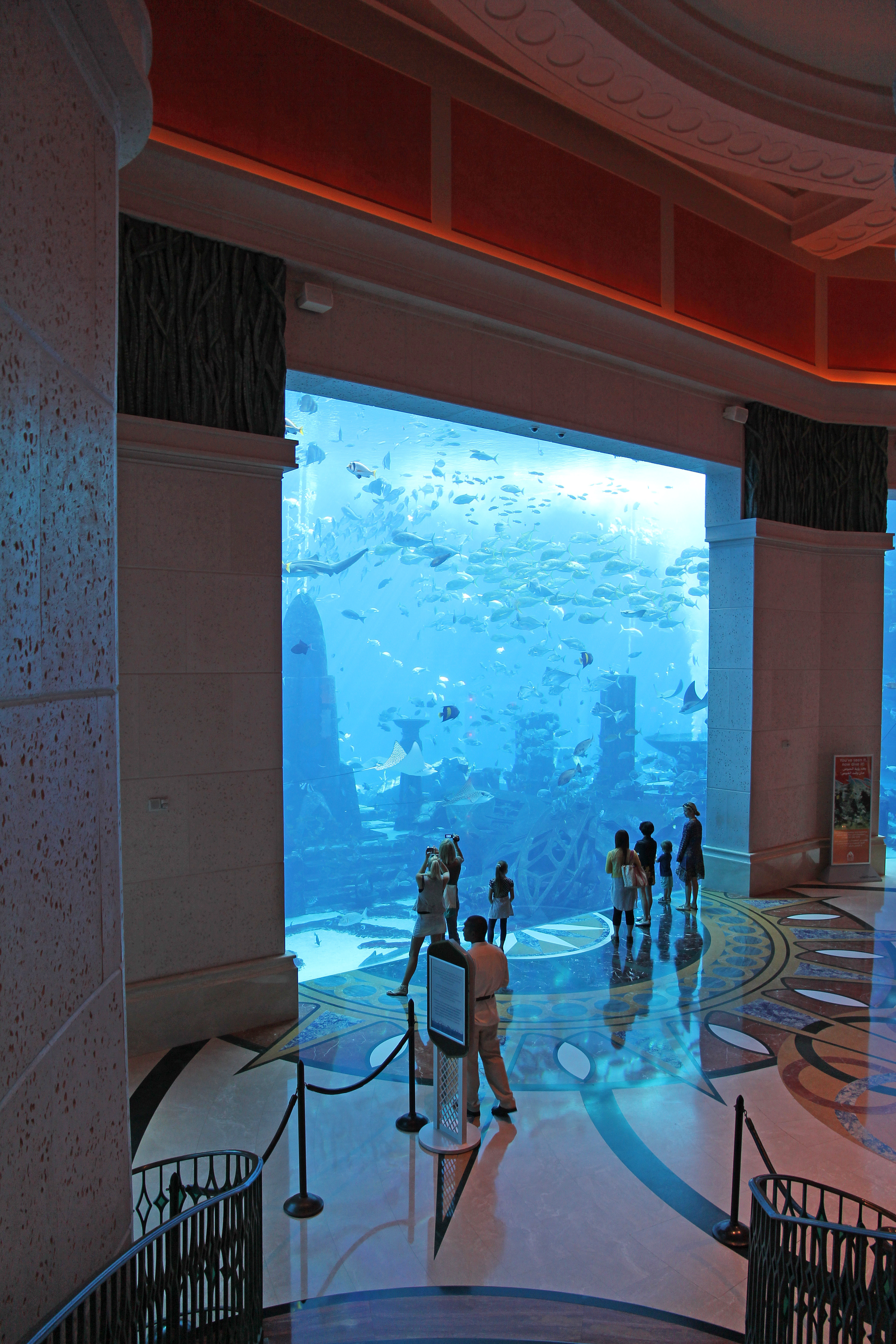
Hotel aquarium

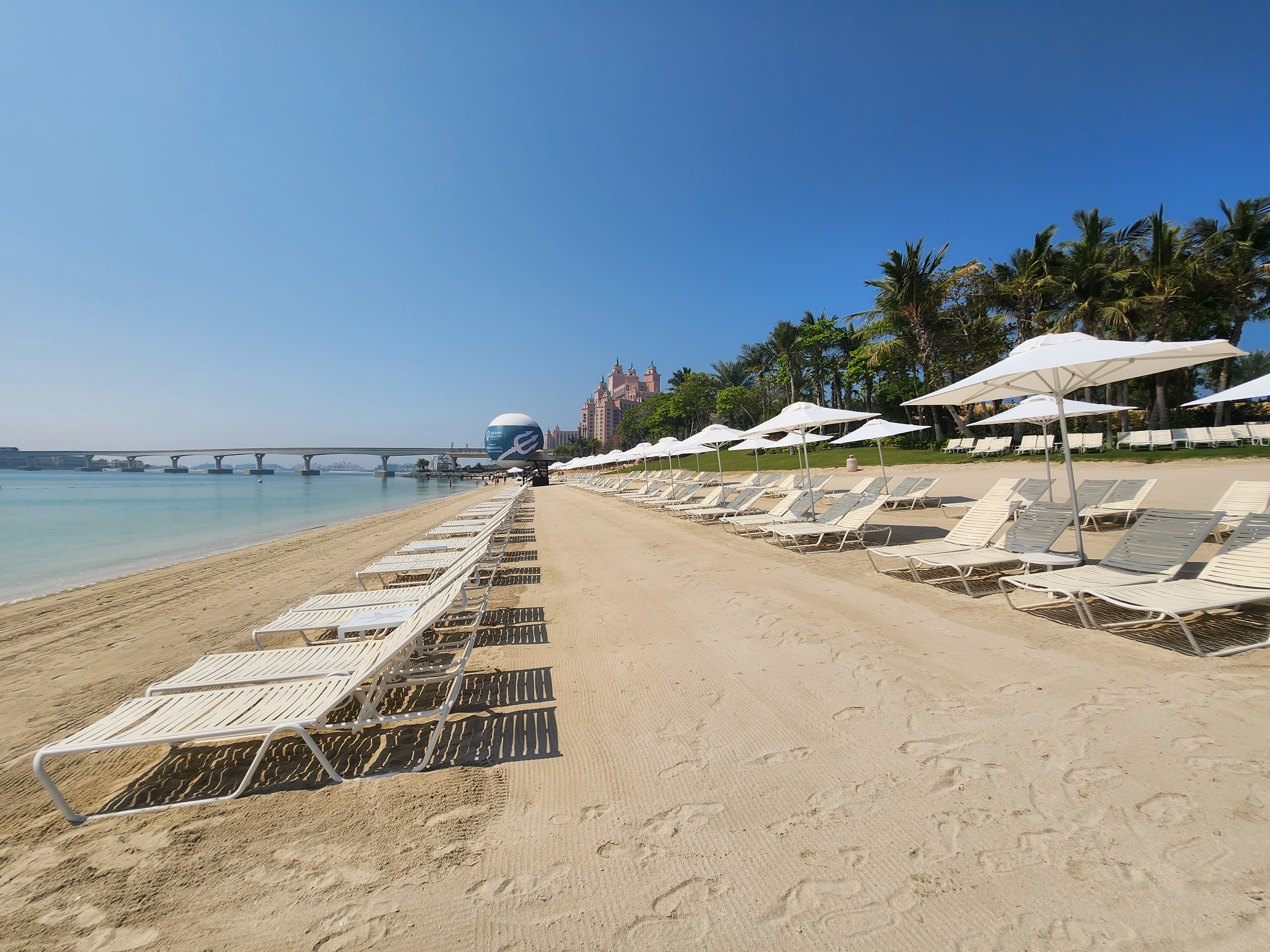
Aquaventure Beach

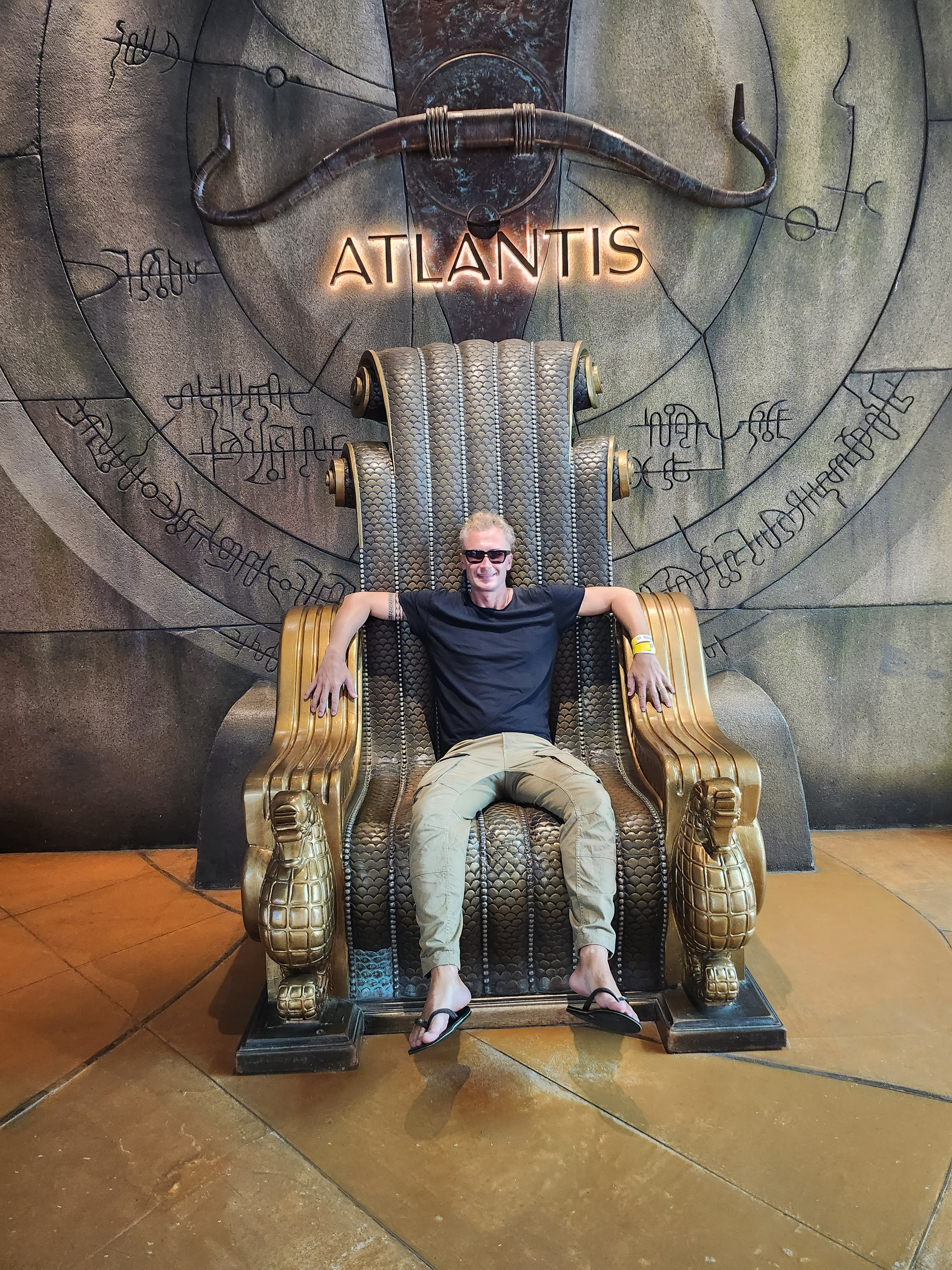
Aquaventure Water Park

Ocean-side aerial view of Atlantis, The Palm

== See also ==
- Dubai World
- Atlantis The Royal, Dubai
- List of hotels in Dubai
- Atlantis Paradise Island – similar looking hotel by Sol Kerzner
- Atlantis Sanya
- Atlantis Resorts
