= The Cove Luxury Resort =

Hotel on Paradise Island, Bahamas

Coordinates: 25°5′6.169″N 77°19′21.312″W

The Cove
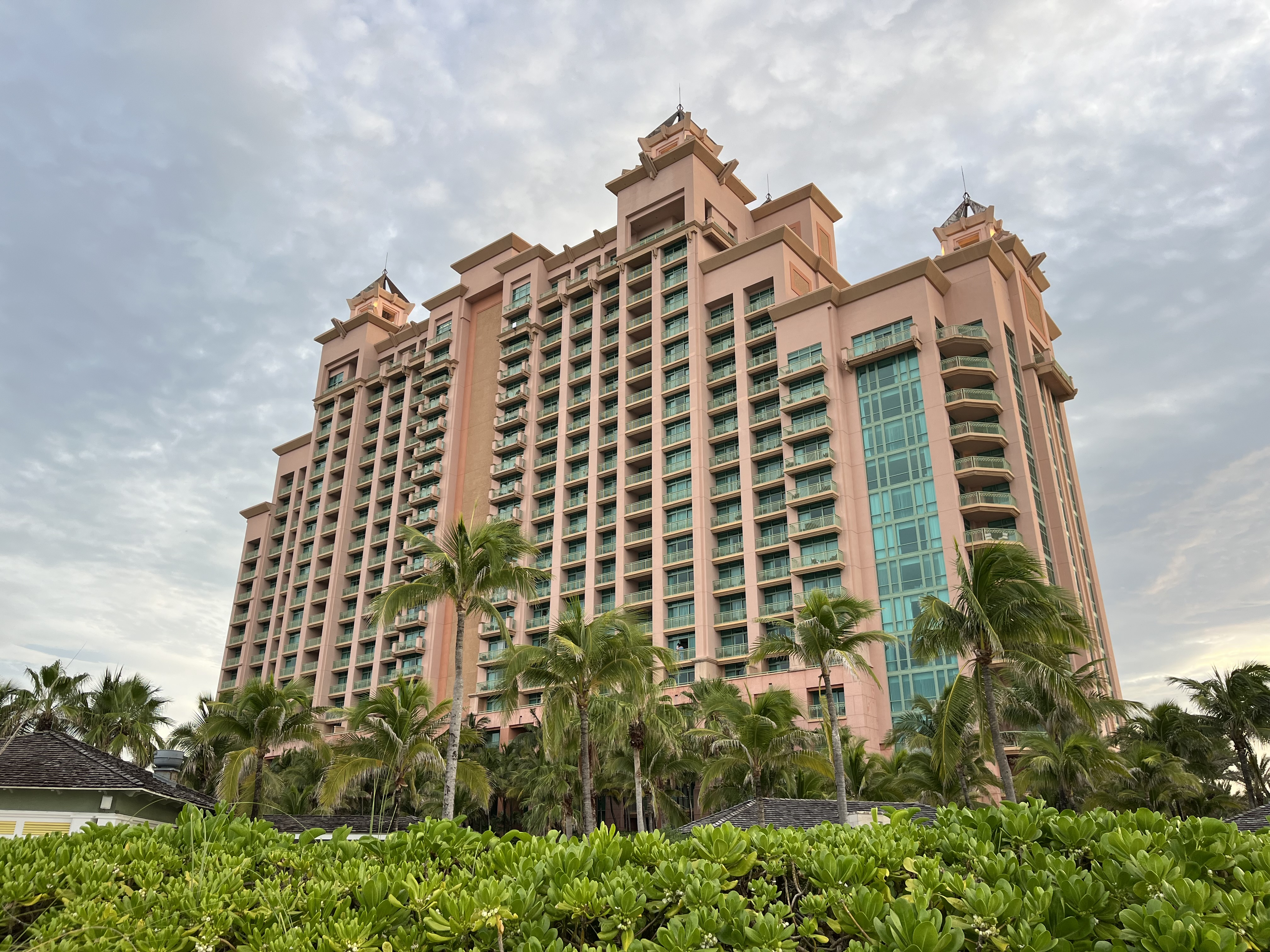
- Interactive map of The Cove
- Location: Paradise Island; 1 Casino Drive
- No. of rooms: 600
- Signature attractions: AquaVenture Water Park
- Notable restaurants: Paranza
- Owner: Kerzner International
- Architect: Hirsch Bedner Associates, Jeffrey Beers International
- Renovated in: 2017, 2022
- Website: https://www.atlantisbahamas.com/rooms/thecoveatlantis

The Cove Luxury Resort is a hotel at Atlantis Paradise Island on Paradise Island, Bahamas. It opened March 28, 2007, and the grand opening event was on May 11, 2007. The grand opening event featured a five-song performance from Janet Jackson, along with attendees like Usher, Ashanti, Kanye West, Michael Jordan and Steven Tyler. The price of construction was $1 billion and there are 600 rooms, a spa, an adults-only pool and an Aquaventure water park. A majority of the rooms feature ocean views. The Cove closed for 11 months during the COVID-19 pandemic and reopened on February 11, 2021.

== Renovations ==
The first overhaul of The Cove was done by Jeffrey Beers International, who had also done the initial interior, Mark Henderson and Hirsch Bedner Associates. The renovation started in September 2015 and the final upgrades were revealed on December 13, 2017. The scope of the renovation included the guestroom redesign, updates to the pool and cabanas, and the opening of two restaurants. The second renovation was in 2022 with the introduction of Lapis Club Lounge, which is a nightclub on the 22nd floor.

== Restaurants ==
- Paranza by Michael White
- Perch
- Frezca
- Fish by José Andrés
- Sea Glass
- Sip Sip (2017-2022)
- Mesa Grill by Bobby Flay (2007-2015)

== Awards ==
- Condé Nast Readers Choice 2010, 2011, 2012, 2013, 2017, 2018, 2019, 2022, 2023, 2024
- Condé Nast Hot List 2018
- Condé Nast World's Best New Hotels 2008
- TripAdvisor Certificate of Excellence 2011, 2012, 2013, 2015, 2016
- U.S. News & World Report Best Hotels in The Bahamas 2013, 2014
- Orbitz Best in Stay Elite Hotel 2014, 2015
- Expedia Insiders’ Select Hotel 2010
- Brides Best Resort Pool 2011
