= Fairmont The Palm =

Hotel in Dubai, UAE

- The hotel in 2013

- Location within United Arab Emirates

General information
- Location: Dubai, United Arab Emirates
- Coordinates: 25°11′01″N 55°14′10″E
- Opening: December 2012
- Owner: Fairmont Hotels and Resorts
- Operator: IFA Hotels and Resorts (subsidiary of Kuwait's International Financial Advisors)

Technical details
- Floor count: 14

Other information
- Number of rooms: 391
- Number of restaurants: 7

Website
- www.fairmont.com/palm-dubai

Fairmont The Palm is a Fairmont Hotels and Resorts five-star hotel located on the trunk of Palm Jumeirah, Dubai, United Arab Emirates. The hotel is located on the world's largest man-made island, shaped in the form of a palm tree. Fairmont The Palm has views of the Persian Gulf and provide access to the Dubai Marina and business hubs such as Dubai Media City, Dubai Internet City and Dubai Knowledge Village. The hotel has 381 rooms and suites, including two presidential suites and a Fairmont Gold Lounge.

== History ==
Fairmont The Palm opened in December 2012 as a joint venture between IFA Hotels & Resorts (IFA HR) and Fairmont Hotels & Resorts. IFA Hotels & Resorts spent $330 million on the development and performance of the hotel.

Clive Ford from DSA Architects International was the chief architect on the project. The hotel's interior was designed by HHCP Design International, which is based in Florida. The hotel also has 3,000 m^{2} (32,000 sq ft) of meeting and function space including a ballroom, outdoor venues and a business center. The hotel was built at a cost of 330 million USD, and was opened on December 24, 2012.

During the 2026 Israeli–United States strikes on Iran, the hotel was struck by debris from an intercepted Iranian drone on 28 February, causing a fire. According to Dubai's Media Office, four people were injured.

== Specifications ==
- A total of 381 rooms comprising Queen, King, King Suite Gold, VIP Suites, Presidential Suites, Fairmont Gold Lounge.
- The hotel comprises one-bedroom units averaging 144 m^{2} (1,550 sq ft) and two-bedroom units averaging 220 m^{2} (2,400 sq ft).
- The hotel has 460 m (1,510 ft) of beachfront.

== Awards ==
Fairmont The Palm has received a variety of hospitality awards including:

- 2014 Travelers' Choice Awards - Top 25 Luxury Hotels in the United Arab Emirates
- 2014 Time Out Dubai Kids Awards - Best Family Beach Club
- 2014 Time Out Dubai Awards - Best Afternoon Tea – Mashrabiya Lounge

== See also ==
- Palm Jumeirah
- List of hotels in Dubai
