= List of hotels in Dubai =

Burj Al Arab, Hotel

This is a list of hotels in Dubai. Dubai leads in the world's highest hotel occupancy rates. As of 2024, Dubai has had more than 800 hotels with more than 150,000 total hotel rooms in Dubai.

== Statistics ==
=== History ===
In 1993, the city had 167 hotels with 9,383 rooms, while the number shot up to 272 hotels and doubled the number of rooms to 23,170 in 2002. In 2005, it increased to 28,999 rooms. In 2008, the hotel rooms jumped to 43,419, with 6,105,813 hotel guests and a 70 percent occupancy rate. In 2009, the number of hotel rooms increased to 58,188. In 2010, it jumped to 67,369 rooms, an increase of 9,181 in one year due to the massive rise in visitor arrivals. Dubai hosted a record 10 million visitors in 2012, an increase of 9.3% from the previous year.

In 2013 more than 32,686 hotel rooms were planned, including 17,162 hotel rooms which were under construction. 30 new hotels opened in 2010 and in January 2010, the occupancy rate was at 81 percent, the second highest ever for Dubai; however, throughout the year, the occupancy rate settled at 71 percent, an increase of one percent from 2009. The city's hotels experienced a decline of 4.2 percent in revenue per available room (RevPAR), which reached $154 million in 2010.

=== Latest ===
Following are the figures according to the Government of Dubai's Dubai Statistics Centre regarding tourism and hotel occupancy as of the fourth quarter in 2021:

- The number of hotels in Dubai was 567 with a total of 112,796 hotel rooms.
- The number of hotel apartment buildings was 188 with a total of 25,154 apartments.
- According to The Middle East Hotel Benchmark Survey by EY MENA, occupancy rates in Dubai hotels decreased by 0.5% between January and October 2019 compared to the rate of 74% between the same period in 2018.
- Revenue per available room decreased by 15% between January and October 2019 compared to the same period in 2018.

== List of completed hotels ==
The Address Downtown

JW Marriott Marquis Dubai

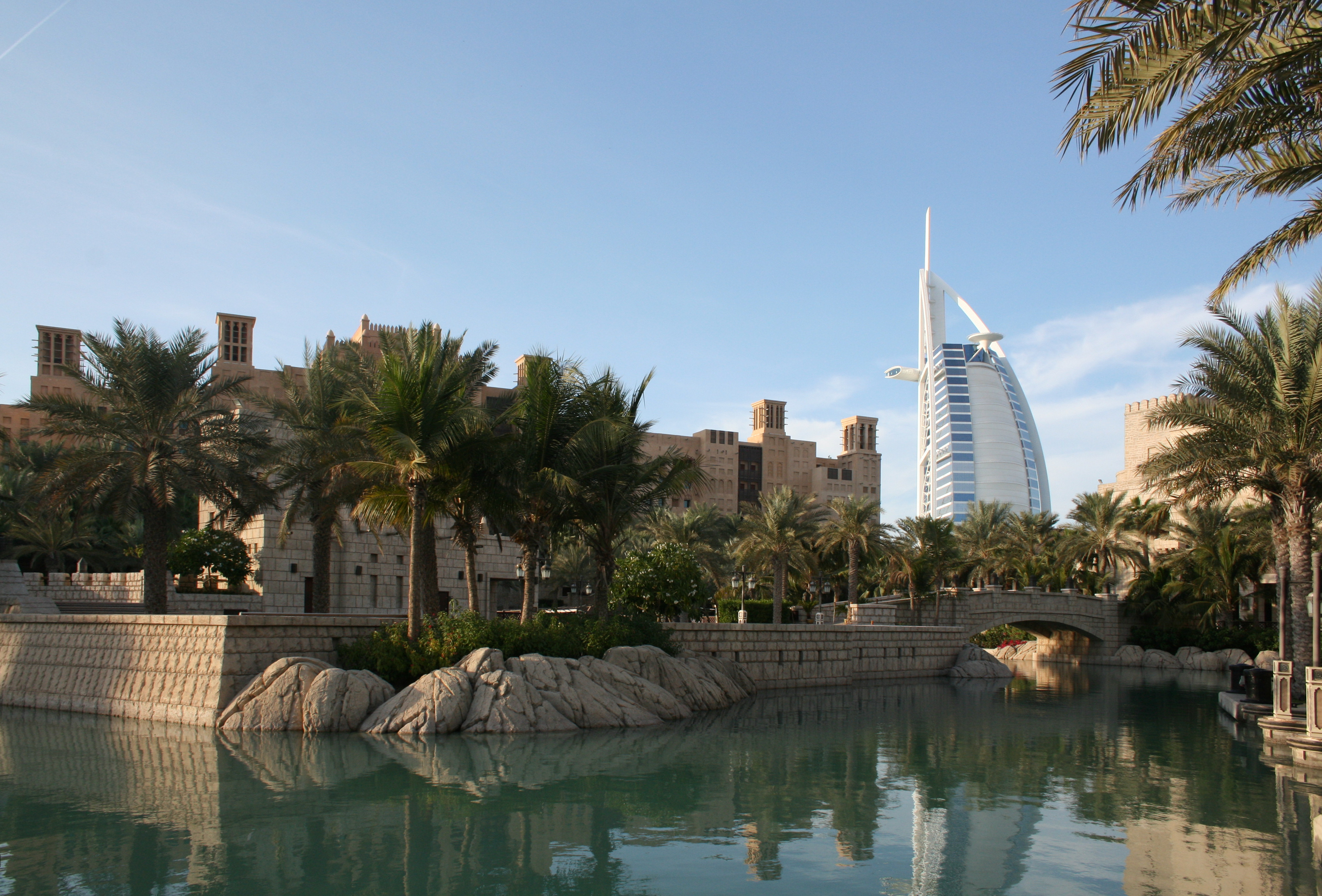
Madinat Jumeirah

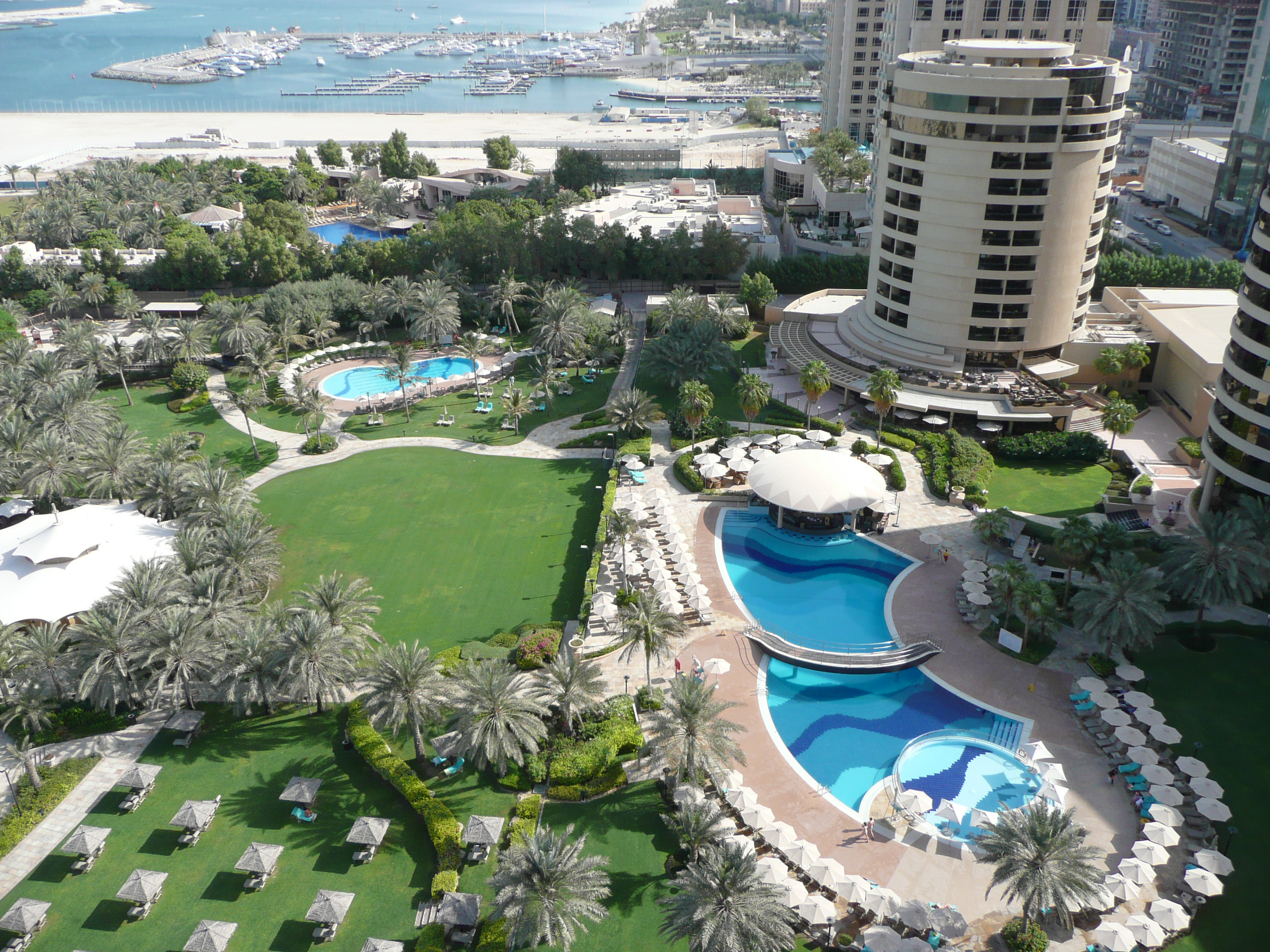
Le Royal Méridien Beach Resort and Spa

Rose Hotel Tower is the world's third tallest hotel.

Ordered by number of rooms.

Hotel	Location	Number of rooms	Opening date	Notes	References
Four Points by Sheraton	Sheikh Zayed Road	385	2008	4-star hotel	
JW Marriott Marquis Dubai	Business Bay	1,608	2012	5-star hotel	
Jumeirah Creekside Hotel	Al Garhoud	292	2011	5-star hotel	
Atlantis The Palm, Dubai	Palm Jumeriah	1,539	2008	5-star hotel	
Ciel Vignette Collection	Dubai Marina	1,026	2025	5-star hotel	
Two Seasons Hotel & Apartments	Dubai Internet City	1,010	2019	4-star hotel	
Hilton Dubai Al Habtoor City	Al Habtoor City	1,004	2018	5-star hotel	
Atana Hotel	Barsha Heights	828	2015	4-star hotel	
Atlantis The Royal, Dubai	Palm Jumeriah	795	2023	5-star hotel	
Ghaya Grand Hotel	Dubai Production City	765	2014	5-star hotel	
Grosvenor House West Marina Beach Dubai	Dubai Marina	749	2005	5-star hotel	
Citymax Hotel Bur Dubai	Al Mankhool	691	2010	3-star hotel	
Grand Hyatt Dubai	Umm Hurair	682	2003	5-star hotel	
Sheraton Grand Hotel, Dubai	Sheikh Zayed Road	654	2015	5-star hotel	
TRYP by Wyndham Dubai	Barsha Heights	650	2017	4-star hotel	
InterContinental Dubai Festival City	Dubai Festival City	619	2007	5-star hotel	
Jumeirah Beach Hotel	Jumeriah Beach	617	1997		
Conrad Dubai	Sheikh Zayed Road	555	2013	5-star hotel	
Gevora Hotel	Sheikh Zayed Road	528	2018	4-star hotel	
Radisson Royal Dubai	Sheikh Zayed Road	471	2010	5-star hotel	
Rose Rayhaan by Rotana	Sheikh Zayed Road	465	2009	4-star hotel	
One&Only Royal Mirage	Jumeirah Beach Road	451	1999	5-star hotel	
Sofitel Dubai Jumeirah Beach	Dubai Marina	438	2009	5-star hotel	
Hyatt Regency Dubai	Al Khaleej Road	414	1980	5-star hotel	
Jumeirah Emirates Towers Hotel	Sheikh Zayed Road	400	1997	5-star hotel	
Kempinski Hotel Mall of the Emirates	Mall of the Emirates	393	2007	5-star hotel	
The Fairmont Palm Hotel & Resort	Palm Jumeirah	381	2011	5-star hotel	
Waldorf Astoria Dubai Palm Jumeirah	Palm Jumeirah	319	2013	5-star hotel	
Grand Millennium Dubai	Sheikh Rashid Road	343	2007	5-star hotel	
Jumeirah Mina A'Salam	Jumeirah Road	292	2003	5-star hotel	
Madinat Jumeirah	Madinat Jumeirah	292	2004	5-star hotel	
Jumeirah Dar Al Masyaf	Madinat Jumeirah	290	2004	5-star hotel	
Al Bustan Hotel	Al Garhoud	275	1997	5-star hotel	2016
Sheraton Dubai Creek Hotel & Towers	Al Sufouh Road, Deira	356	1978	5-star hotel	
Dubai Marriott Harbour Hotel & Suites	Al Sufouh Road	232		5-star hotel	
Al Murooj Rotana Dubai	Al Saffa Street	247	2006	5-star hotel	
Palace Downtown	Downtown Dubai	242	2008	5-star hotel	
Palazzo Versace Dubai	Culture Village	215	2014	5-star hotel	
Metropolitan Hotel	Al Maktoum Street Deira	212		5-star hotel	
Samaya Hotel	Deira	209		5-star hotel	
Burj Al Arab	Jumeirah Beach Road	205	1999	5-star hotel; often called the only 7-star hotel in the world; world's 12th most expensive hotel	
Dubai Marine Beach Resort & Spa	Jumeirah Beach Road	195	1980	5-star hotel	
Dusit Thani Dubai	Sheikh Zayed Road	174	2001	5-star hotel	
Kempinski The Boulevard Dubai	Sheikh Mohammed bin Rashid Boulevard	198	2017	5-star hotel	
Address Downtown	Sheikh Mohammed bin Rashid Boulevard	626	2008	5-star hotel	
One&Only One Za'abeel	Za'abeel	229	2024	5-star hotel located in the Za'abeel district.	

== List of hotels under construction ==
List of hotels under construction, on hold, or proposed hotels in Dubai:

Hotel	Location	Notes	References
Mandarin Oriental Wasl Tower	Sheik Zayed Road	Under construction, opening in 2023 with 257 rooms	
MGM Resort Dubai	Jumeirah Beach	Opening 2026	
Voco Dubai The Palm	Palm Jumeirah West Beach	Opening in 2023 with 138 rooms	
Five Luxe	Jumeirah Beach	Opening in 2023	
Jumeriah Marsa Al Arab	Jumeriah Beach Road	Opening in 2023 with 386 rooms	
Kempinski Floating Palace	Persian Gulf/Jumeriah Beach	Floating hotel opening in 2023 with 156 rooms	
Mama Shelter	Business Bay	Opening in 2023 and will have 197 rooms	
NH Dubai The Palm	Palm Jumeriah	Part of the Seven Palm project and opening in 2023	
The Lana	Business Bay	225 rooms originally The Dorchester opening in Summer 2023	
SO/Uptown Dubai	Uptown Dubai	Five star hotel with 188 rooms opening in 2023	
Moon Resort Dubai	Undecided	Proposed Moon shaped resort, one of 4 planned around the world.	

== See also ==
- List of shopping malls in Dubai
- List of buildings in Dubai
- Lists of hotels – an index of hotel list articles on Wikipedia
