= Sol Kerzner =

South African businessman (1935–2020)

- Born: 23 August 1935; Durban, Natal, Union of South Africa
- Died: 21 March 2020 (aged 84); Cape Town, Western Cape, South Africa
- Education: University of the Witwatersrand, Johannesburg; B.Com (Accounting); B.Com (Hons) (Accounting)
- Occupations: Founder and Chairman of Kerzner International
- Spouses: Maureen Adler; Shirley Bestbier (death) Anneline Kriel (m. 1980; div. 1985) Heather Murphy (m. 2000; div. 2011)
- Children: with Adler: Howard Kerzner; Andrea Kerzner; Beverly Kerzner Mace; with Bestbier: Brandon Kerzner; Chantal Kerzner Sweeney

Solomon 'Sol' Kerzner, KCMG (23 August 1935 – 21 March 2020) was a South African accountant and business magnate. He founded both of South Africa's largest hotel groups, the Southern Sun Hotel Group and Sun International. He was also the founder, chairman and CEO of Kerzner International. During his career in the resort industry, he was involved in various political and business controversies.

== Early life and education ==
Kerzner was born in Durban to Russian Jewish immigrants. His family owned and operated a chain of kosher hotels. Kerzner played with the Johannesburg Symphony Orchestra and was an avid boxer, becoming a varsity welterweight champion. He graduated from the University of the Witwatersrand, Johannesburg with a BCom (Hons) in accounting, and later qualified as a Chartered Accountant. He then took control of the family company.

== Career ==
In 2001, he purchased the Astra Hotel in Durban. In December 1964, he built South Africa's first five-star hotel, the Beverly Hills Hotel, in Umhlanga, a town north of Durban.

Kerzner next built the 450-room Elangeni Hotel (now part of the combined Southern Sun Elangeni & Maharani), overlooking Durban's beachfront and, in 1969, in partnership with South African Breweries, he established the chain of Southern Sun Hotels, which by 1983 operated 30 luxury hotels with more than 7,000 rooms. In 1975, Kerzner opened his first hotel outside South Africa on the Indian Ocean island of Mauritius, which he named Le Saint Géran.

=== Sun City ===
In 1979, Kerzner developed Sun City, the most ambitious resort project in Africa. Over ten years, he built four hotels, a man-made lake, two Gary Player-designed championship golf courses, and an entertainment centre with an indoor 6,000-seat multipurpose arena at which many superstars performed, including Frank Sinatra, Liza Minnelli, Queen, and Shirley Bassey. The arena was also the venue of many World Title fights promoted by Bob Arum. In 1985, the Sun City resort was the topic of the anti-Apartheid rock album Sun City by a group of rock musicians calling themselves Artists United Against Apartheid.

In 1994, following South Africa's first multiracial elections, incoming President Nelson Mandela asked Kerzner to arrange the VIP function at his inauguration, which was attended by about 1,000 people, including many world leaders and heads of state.

=== Mohegan Sun ===
In 1996, Kerzner opened the Mohegan Sun casino in Uncasville, Connecticut. In 2000, a second phase of the project opened, including a 1,200-room hotel through a joint venture with the Mohegan Tribe of Connecticut called Trading Cove Associates. TCA relinquished its management of the resort in 2002, but Kerzner through his company received a 5% dividend on the gross revenue generated by Mohegan Sun until 2014. The property is one of the largest gambling and entertainment complexes in the United States.

=== Later career ===
As a result of the success of the Sun City Resort with its Gary Player Country Club golf course, Kerzner became involved in international hotels and leisure and gambling resorts, most notably as the developer of the Atlantis Resort in The Bahamas. In that capacity, in 1994, he made his first major acquisition outside Africa with the purchase of the Paradise Island Resort in The Bahamas. This 1,150-room resort was in bankruptcy at the time. After acquiring the resort, Kerzner redeveloped and expanded it into a 2,300-room resort with one of the world's grandest artificial marine habitats and the Caribbean's biggest casino.

In 2002, Kerzner launched One&Only Resorts, which operates numerous properties in The Bahamas, Mexico, Mauritius, the Maldives, South Africa, Dubai, Rwanda and Hayman Island. New projects are planned for China, Montenegro, and Saudi Arabia.

In early 2007, Kerzner expanded Atlantis, Paradise Island with 2 new hotels; The Cove, and The Reef, which added 1,100 new rooms to the property. This expansion was overseen by Alan Leibman, which included 21 retail outlets and new restaurants by celebrity chefs Jean-Georges Vongerichten, Nobu Matsuhisa and Bobby Flay. Kerzner extended the Atlantis brand globally with the development of Atlantis, The Palm, Dubai, with a 1,500-room, water-themed resort opened in late-September 2008 on the Palm Jumeirah, a multibillion-dollar leisure and residential development in Dubai. In September 2009, the "Mazagan Beach Resort" a luxury hotel in El Jadida, Morocco, was inaugurated by Kerzner accompanied by show celebrities.

In October 2013, Kerzner announced that he was building a new Atlantis hotel at Sanya, Hainan Island in China with Fosun International. The 62-hectare resort has 1,300 rooms and a water park like the other Atlantis hotels. The project is reported to have cost $1.63 billion.

== Honours ==
Kerzner was awarded the Lifetime Achievement Award for his contributions to the industry during the International Hotel Investment Forum (IHIF) in 2019.

Kerzner was appointed an honorary Knight Commander of the Order of St Michael and St George, which allowed him to have the postnominal letters 'K.C.M.G.' after his name but not the prenominal title of 'Sir' before his name, as he was not a citizen of a Commonwealth realm or the U.K.

In 2024, at the South African Jewish Board of Deputies' 120th anniversary gala dinner, he was honoured among 100 remarkable Jewish South Africans who have contributed to South Africa. The ceremony included speeches from Chief Rabbi Ephraim Mirvis, and Kerzner was honoured among other business figures such as Raymond Ackerman, Barney Barnato and Donald Gordon.

== Controversies ==
In 1984, Kerzner made a deal with Leslie Young, the Minister of Finance for the bantustan of Bophutatswana, that any investments by his company, Sun International, would be tax-deductible. Sun International paid next to no money for taxes in South Africa due to tax breaks.

In 1987, Young and Kerzner made an agreement that 90% of taxes from entertainers in Bophutatswana would go to Sun International, with any entertainer making more than R26,000 having to pay half their income to Bophutatswana.

In 1990, Kerzner was found to have paid R5 million to Transkeian Chief George Matanzima for gaming licenses, R2 million of which was said to be a bribe. The case surrounding this was dropped in 1997.

In 1997, Alan Greenblo was banned from publishing a biography on Kerzner, Kerzner - Unauthorized. Kerzner wanted sections of the book to be removed, but Witwatersrand Judge Monas Flemming banned it. Sections of the book were published in Noseweek the same year.

Kerzner was a contact listed in Jeffrey Epstein's "little black book", which gained attention after the death of Epstein, a convicted sex offender.

== Personal life ==
Kerzner was married four times. His first wife was Maureen Adler. They had three children: Butch Kerzner, Andrea Kerzner and Beverly Kerzner Mace. His second wife was Shirley Bestbier; they had two children: Brandon Kerzner and Chantal Kerzner Sweeney. She died by suicide soon after her second child's birth.

His marriage to his third wife, Miss World 1974 Anneline Kriel, ended in divorce after five years. In the 1990s, he was engaged to model Christina Estrada and got engaged, but they did not marry. He married his fourth wife, Heather Murphy, in 2000, and they divorced in 2011.

Kerzner's son, Howard "Butch" Kerzner died on 11 October 2006 when the helicopter he was traveling in crashed near Sosua, in the Dominican Republic. He left behind his wife, Vanessa Kerzner, and two children Tai and Kailin. Sol Kerzner's daughter, Andrea, is the founder and CEO of Lalela, a charity dedicated to bringing the arts to at-risk youth in South Africa.

== Death ==
Kerzner died of cancer on 21 March 2020 at 18:52, at his family residence in the Leeukoppie Estate near Cape Town, surrounded by his family.

A spokesperson for the Kerzner family confirmed his passing and emphasised Kerzner’s dual legacy as an immense figure in global hospitality and a devoted family man.

International leaders and institutions paid tribute. The at the time Prime Minister of the Bahamas, Hubert Minnis, hailed Kerzner as a transformative entrepreneur whose development of the Atlantis resort significantly advanced the nation’s tourism industry and social infrastructure.
