= Astral Hotels =

Israeli hotel chain

Astral Hotels is a chain of hotels in Eilat, Israel.

== History ==
The chain was founded by two businessmen from Eilat, Benny Zerach and Asher Gabay. The first hotel they bought was Astral Nirvana in 1995, followed by Astral Coral at 2001. Both are located at Eilat Airport.

In 2003 they acquired their third hotel, Astral Maris (former Galey Eilat and Astral seaside). Buying this property led to the establishment of the Astral Hotels chain. Astral Maris is located on the Eilat Promenade, near the seashore.

In 2005, Astral Village (the former Moon Valley) was purchased. In 2010, the chain's fifth hotel, Astral Palma (formerly the Marina Club and Astral Marina), was purchased. Astral Palma is a suites hotel located on the Eilat lagoon.

In July 2018, Gabay and Zerach purchased the closed 25-room Motel 8 on the Las Vegas Strip for $7.4 million. Astral leased out the motel, which reopened in December 2018, while Astral had plans to eventually redevelop the one-acre site. In March 2019, Astral announced plans to replace Motel 8 with a 34-story, 620-room hotel and casino to be known as Astral. Groundbreaking is scheduled for 2020, with completion expected in 2022, at a cost between $325 and $350 million.

== List of hotels ==
- Astral Coral
- Astral (Las Vegas) (opening delayed)
- Astral Maris (Sea Side)
- Astral Nirvana
- Astral Palma (Marina)
- Astral Village
