= The Lawrence Herbert School of Communication =

Communications school at Hofstra University

Coordinates: 40.713°N 73.600°W

- Established: 1995 as Hofstra School of Communication; named for Lawrence Herbert in 2013
- Accreditation: Accrediting Council on Education in Journalism and Mass Communications (Since 2002)
- Dean: Mark Lukasiewicz
- Students: 1,108 (Fall 2016)
- Location: 111 Hofstra University, Hempstead, New York, 11549, USA
- Campus: Hofstra University
- Website: https://www.hofstra.edu/communication/

The Lawrence Herbert School of Communication is the communications school at Hofstra University. It has eleven distinct degrees ranging from Journalism and Public Relations to Filmmaking and Radio Production.

== History ==
Hofstra University had been offering communication courses since 1970, particularly with their program in communication arts. In 1995, over 500 student were already enrolled in communications classes and then University president James Shuart had created what was then known as the School of Communication in 1995. The school initially had three departments including Audio/Video/Film, Journalism and Mass Media Studies, and Speech Communication and Rhetorical Studies, which is now a part of the School of Health Sciences and College of Liberal Arts and Sciences, respectively. The school is still housed in its inaugural location of George G. Dempster Hall, named after a 1961 Hofstra alum and the former chairman of the board of trustees. Newsday reporter Bob Greene had become one of the first faculty members, being named the Lawrence Stessin Distinguished professor of journalism.

In 1997, Gary Kreps was appointed as the first dean of the school. After Kreps' departure in 1999, George Back, a Hofstra alum off 1962, had been appointed the dean of the Communications school. In 2002, Dean Back had secured an agreement with CBS News to set up a Long Island Bureau for the school. That same year, the school was officially first accredited by the Accrediting Council on Education in Journalism and Mass Communications. In 2004, Sybil Delgaudio was appointed the new dean of the School of Communication. On July 15 2010, Evan Cornog, a former associate dean at Columbia's Journalism School and press secretary to former New York City mayor Ed Koch. The current dean is Mark Lukasiewicz, who was a former news executive for both ABC News and NBC News.

In 2010, the school's radio station WRHU was named as the home radio station for the National Hockey League's New York Islanders. By 2011, CBS News had departed the Long Island Bureau at the school after its acquisition of WLNY. In 2013, the school was named for alumnus Lawrence Herbert, for his career accomplishments including the invention of the Pantone system. In 2022, the school collaborated with WABC-TV to open up their Long Island Bureau for the station.

The school is home to numerous programs, including WRHU, the school's radio station which has won numerous accolades, most notably four Marconi Radio Awards for College Station of the Year. Other notable programs include the HEAT Network, and the Hofstra Chronicle among others.

== Academics ==
The Lawrence Herbert School of Communication currently has two departments of Journalism, Media Studies, and Public Relations, along with a department of Radio, Television and Film.

Department of Journalism, Media Studies, and Public Relations:

- Bachelor of Arts in Journalism
- Bachelor of Arts in Mass Media Studies
- Bachelor of Arts in Public Relations & Strategic Communication
- Bachelor of Science in Sports Media
- Master of Arts in Journalism
- Master of Arts in Public Relations

Department of Radio, Television, and Film:

- Bachelor of Arts in Podcasting and Audio Storytelling (formerly Audio/Radio Production and Studies)
- Bachelor of Arts in Film Studies and Production
- Bachelor of Arts in Television Production and Studies
- Bachelor of Fine Arts in Filmmaking
- Bachelor of Fine Arts in Writing for the Screen
- Bachelor of Science in Video/Television
- Bachelor of Science in Video/Television and Business
- Bachelor of Science in Video/Television and Film

== Accreditation ==
The school's Journalism department is accredited by the Accrediting Council on Education in Journalism and Mass Communications, with its most recent accreditation completed in 2022.

== Notable alumni ==
- Shirleen Allicot '04, news anchor at WABC-TV
- Amanda Balionis '08, CBS Sports reporter
- Ryan Broderick '12, former writer at BuzzFeed, Gawker and Vice
- Katie Nolan '09, host of ESPN's Always Late with Katie Nolan
- Joe Pantorno '13, sportswriter
- Andrew Rea ‘09, creator of Babish Culinary Universe
- Brandon 'Scoop B' Robinson '11, television analyst at MSG Networks
- Steve Rubel, Chief Media Ecologist at Edelman
- Faridah Demola Seriki '13, Grammy Award-nominated artist
- Lance Ulanoff '86, Editor-In Chief of Lifewire
- Jay Wallace '00, President and Executive Editor of Fox News
