= List of restaurants in Canada =

Canada has over 97,000 restaurants, bars, and caterers, making up 1.5% of the country's GDP.

== By location (province/territory, city) ==
This section excludes large chain restaurants based outside of the listed location. See list of Canadian restaurant chains instead.

=== British Columbia ===
- Rocko's Diner
- Sooke Harbour House
- Mr. Mike's

=== Manitoba ===
- Salisbury House

=== New Brunswick ===
- Greco Pizza Restaurant
- Pizza Delight

=== Northwest Territories ===
- Surly Bob's
- The Wildcat Cafe

=== Nova Scotia ===
- Bud the Spud
- The Chickenburger
- Halifax Alehouse
- King of Donair
- The Red Shoe

=== Ontario ===
- Chez Piggy
- Oasis Drive-In
- Restaurant Pearl Morissette
- Webers

==== Ottawa ====
- Alice
- Atelier
- Colonnade Pizza
- House of Targ
- Kettleman's Bagel Co.
- Newport Restaurant
- North & Navy
- Perch
- Rideau Street McDonald's
- Riviera
- Shawarma Palace
- SuzyQ Doughnuts
- Tucker's Marketplace

==== Toronto ====
- Aburi Hana
- Alo
- Alobar Yorkville
- Barberian's Steak House
- Big Smoke Burger
- Caplansky's Delicatessen
- Don Alfonso 1890
- Edulis
- Enigma Yorkville
- Fran's Restaurant
- Free Times Cafe
- Frilu
- The Goof
- Hugh's Room
- Johnny's Hamburgers
- Kaiseki Yu-zen Hashimoto
- Lakeview Restaurant
- Miller Tavern
- The One Eighty
- Osteria Giulia
- Pai Northern Thai Kitchen
- Quetzal
- The Rivoli
- Rosedale Diner
- Shopsy's
- Shoushin
- Sneaky Dee's
- Sushi Masaki Saito
- Yukashi

==== Waterloo Region ====
- Arabesque Family Restaurant
- Bao Sandwich Bar
- Bhima's Warung
- Ethel's Lounge
- Huether Hotel
- Lancaster Smokehouse
- Meetpoint
- Public Kitchen & Bar
- Veslo Family Restaurant
- The Yeti Cafe

=== Quebec ===
- Ashton

==== Gatineau and the Outaouais ====
- Café Henry Burger
- Edgar
- Les Fougères
- Soif Bar à vin

==== Montreal ====
- Au Pied de Cochon
- La Banquise
- Bâton Rouge
- La Binerie Mont-Royal
- Boustan
- Casa del Popolo
- Chenoy's
- Le Cheval Blanc
- Cuisine AuntDai
- Décarie Hot Dogs
- Dunn's
- Eaton's Ninth Floor Restaurant
- Gibeau Orange Julep
- J&R Kosher Meat and Delicatessen
- Joe Beef
- Le Piment Rouge
- Restaurant Pizzaiolle
- Mikes
- Moishes Steakhouse
- Montreal Pool Room
- Schwartz's
- Toqué!
- Wilensky's

==== Quebec City ====
- Aux Anciens Canadiens
- Bistro 1640

== By type ==
=== Asian ===
- BB's
- Karma Indian Bistro
- Pai Northern Thai Kitchen

==== Chinese ====
- Cuisine AuntDai
- Seaport City Seafood
- Sunnys Chinese

==== Japanese ====
- Aburi Hana
- Kaiseki Yu-zen Hashimoto
- Kappo Sato
- Kissa Tanto
- Masayoshi
- Motonobu Udon
- Shoushin
- Sushi Hil
- Sushi Masaki Saito
- Tetsu Sushi Bar
- Yukashi

=== Delicatessens ===
- Bens De Luxe Delicatessen & Restaurant
- Caplansky's Delicatessen
- Chenoy's
- Dunn's
- J&R Kosher Meat and Delicatessen
- Main Deli Steak House
- Schwartz's
- Shopsy's
- Wilensky's

=== European ===
==== French ====
- Alo
- Alobar Yorkville
- Bistro 990
- Lumière
- La Société
- St. Lawrence

==== Italian ====
- Don Alfonso 1890
- Kissa Tanto
- Osteria Giulia

== See also ==
- Canadian cuisine
- North American cuisine
