= Zen (restaurant) =

Japanese restaurant in Markham, Ontario, Canada

Coordinates: 43.8292°N 79.3531°W

- Interactive map of Zen

Restaurant information
- Established: 2000
- Owner: Seiichi Kashiwabara
- Head chef: Seiichi Kashiwabara
- Food type: Japanese
- Rating: Recommended (Michelin Guide)
- Location: 7634 Woodbine Avenue, Markham, Ontario, Canada
- Website: zenjapaneserestaurant.com

Zen is a Michelin recommended Japanese restaurant in the Milliken Mills neighbourhood of Markham, Ontario, Canada, located north of Toronto. It offers an omakase menu.

== History ==
The restaurant is owned and operated by chef Seiichi Kashiwabara, who immigrated to Canada from Japan in 1984. Kashiwabara first lived in Ottawa, working as a sushi chef there before moving to the Toronto area.

Zen, a Japanese restaurant situated in a Markham strip mall, was first established in 2000. Kashiwabara initially joined Zen as head chef upon relocating to Toronto. He later acquired the restaurant and moved it from its original Scarborough location to its current address in Markham.

The business only uses fresh fish for their sushi, much of it delivered from Japan several times weekly. Many of the employees of the restaurant are Japanese nationals, who have come to work at Zen via work permit to train under Kashiwabara. Notable sushi chefs in the Toronto-area have worked at Zen and trained under Kashiwabara, including Michelin–starred Shoushin chef-owner Jackie Lin and Takeshi Sato, the head chef of Michelin-starred Kappo Sato.

== Recognition ==
The business received a 'Recommended' designation in the 2024 edition of the Toronto and Region Michelin Guide. Michelin highlighted the restaurant's price point for its omakase chef's counter experience, and also praised the restaurant for having "some of the best nori in town." Per the guide, a 'Recommended' selection "is the sign of a chef using quality ingredients that are well cooked; simply a good meal" and that the anonymous inspectors had found "the food to be above average, but not quite at [Michelin star] level." As of the 2024 edition, Zen is the only restaurant in Markham to be included in the Toronto guide. Michelin–starred Markham restaurant Frilu was also in the guide before its closure in summer 2024.

Toronto-area digital publication BlogTO lauded Zen as "long holding the reputation as one of the best sushi joints in town."

Zen was included in magazine Toronto Life's list of the best Japanese restaurants in Greater Toronto, with the publication highlighting the business's "meticulously cut" sashimi plates.

In 2022, Markham made United States food publication Eater's list of best food cities to travel to, with Zen receiving a callout as the "go-to destination for hardcore omakase aficionados."
