= LSL (restaurant) =

Restaurant in Toronto, Ontario, Canada

- Interactive map of LSL

Restaurant information
- Established: May 17, 2024; 2 years ago
- Owner: William Cheng
- Head chef: Christian Le Squer; Masaki Saito
- Food type: French; Japanese
- Rating: Recommended (Michelin Guide)
- Location: 2066 Avenue Road, Toronto, Ontario, M5M 4A6, Canada
- Coordinates: 43°44′11.087″N 79°25′13.333″W
- Seating capacity: 9
- Website: lslrestaurant.ca

LSL, officially Leroy, Saito, Le Squer, is a Michelin-recommended French-Japanese restaurant located in the North York neighbourhood of Toronto, Ontario, Canada.

== History ==
The restaurant was opened in 2024 by Toronto-based entrepreneur and restaurant investor William Cheng, who also owns local Michelin-starred restaurants Shoushin and Sushi Masaki Saito.

The restaurant was conceived following a series of collaborative dinners hosted by Cheng involving chefs Didier Leroy and Masaki Saito, including a private event in 2022 that helped shape its culinary direction. Leroy was offered the head chef role of the restaurant, while Saito and French chef Christian Le Squer later joined the project as executive chefs. The restaurant's name, LSL, reflects the surnames of all three chefs.

Leroy departed LSL at the end of December 2025, with the restaurant remaining temporarily closed as of February 2026 while it reconfigures its concept.

== Concept ==
LSL is a fine dining omakase-style restaurant centred on French and Japanese cuisine, using high-end Japanese ingredients prepared using French techniques. With three executive chefs named at opening, each was appointed to handle a distinct aspect of the concept. Saito oversaw the sourcing of seasonal Japanese ingredients, Le Squer led menu development, and Leroy managed day-to-day kitchen operations.

Up to nine guests are seated at a counter facing an open kitchen. A single tasting menu is served per evening, with one seating per night.

Some of the courses served at the restaurant mirror the signature dishes seen at Le Squer's three Michelin-star restaurant Le Cinq, including its lobster bisque and "jewelry box" pasta in porcini broth.

== Recognition ==
The business received a 'Recommended' designation in the 2025 edition of the Toronto and Region Michelin Guide, with the guide highlighting the "luxury" on display the restaurant. Per the guide, a 'Recommended' selection "is the sign of a chef using quality ingredients that are well cooked; simply a good meal" and that the anonymous inspectors had found "the food to be above average, but not quite at [Michelin star] level."

In 2025, LSL ranked #9 on Toronto Life magazine's best new restaurants list, singling out the "military precision" in its cooking and service.

=== Canada's 100 Best Restaurants Ranking ===
The restaurant debuted at #51 on Canada's 100 Best Restaurants in the publication's 2025 edition. It was also ranked the second best new restaurant for that year, behind Montreal's Le Violon.

LSL
Year	Rank	Change
2025	51	new

== See also ==
- List of French restaurants
