= Surly =

Surly may refer to:

== Fiction ==
- Surly Squirrel, a cartoon character created by Peter Lepeniotis and from The Nut Job, and its sequel The Nut Job 2: Nutty by Nature
- Surly Bob, a 19th-century English children's novel by Luisa C. Silke
- Surly, a fairy from Ni no Kuni
- Surly the sarcosuchus from Dino Time
- Surly, a surfer punk from the 1987 movie, Back to the Beach
- Sweetie Surly, a video game character from Stonekeep

== Organizations ==
- Surly Bikes, a Bloomington-based brand in the U.S. state of Minnesota
- Surly Brewing Company, a beer producer and distributor in the U.S. state of Minnesota
- Surly Bob's, a former sports bar in Yellowknife, Northwest Territories, Canada

== See also ==
- HMS Surly, four ships of the British Royal Navy
