= L'Atelier =

L'Atelier may refer to:

- The Workshop (film), a 2017 French drama film
- L'Atelier (painting), an 1821 painting by Horace Vernet
- The Painter's Studio, an 1855 painting by Courbet

== See also ==
- Atelier (disambiguation)
