= The Pine =

Chinese restaurant in Ontario, Canada

- Interactive map of The Pine

Restaurant information
- Established: August 1, 2020
- Owners: Jeremy Austin; Cassie Austin
- Manager: Cassie Austin
- Head chef: Jeremy Austin
- Food type: Chinese
- Rating: (Michelin Guide)
- Location: Canada
- Coordinates: 44.3307°N 80.1058°W
- Seating capacity: 24
- Website: www.thepinecreemore.ca

The Pine is a Michelin-starred Chinese restaurant in Creemore, Ontario, Canada.

== History ==
The restaurant originally opened in Collingwood in August 2020, before relocating to Creemore in spring 2024. Both municipalities are situated in Ontario's Simcoe County, part of the northern Greater Toronto Area. The restaurant is owned by husband-and-wife duo Jeremy and Cassie Austin. Jeremy serves as the head chef, while Cassie acts as the general manager.

The business first opened amid indoor dining restrictions in Ontario during the COVID-19 pandemic, operating as a 12-seat pop-up restaurant at an outdoor harvest table. The business's name, The Pine, originates from the pop-up location surrounded by pine forest.

== Concept ==
The Pine offers a 17-course tasting menu and wine pairing. It sources most of its ingredients from local producers across Simcoe Region and Central Ontario.

Although Jeremy Austin is not of Chinese origin, his culinary techniques and the restaurant's dishes are influenced by his years of experience working in China and Hong Kong.

== Recognition ==
The restaurant received a Michelin star in the 2024 edition of the Toronto and Region Michelin Guide, and retained its star in 2025.

The restaurant placed on North America's 50 Best Restaurants list in 2026, ranking #48.

=== Canada's 100 Best Restaurants Ranking ===
The Pine
Year	Rank	Change
2022	51	new
2023	47	▲4
2024	40	▲7
2025	19	▲21
2026	11	▲8

== See also ==
- List of Chinese restaurants
- List of Michelin-starred restaurants in Toronto
