= Rosedale Diner =

Defunct restaurant in Toronto, Ontario, Canada

- Interactive map of Rosedale Diner

Restaurant information
- Established: 1978
- Closed: December 31, 2023
- Previous owners: Dubi and Esti Filar
- Food type: Bistro comfort food with a Middle Eastern flare
- Location: 1164 Yonge St, Toronto, Ontario, M4W 2L9, Canada
- Coordinates: 43.6804°N 79.3911°W
- Reservations: Yes
- Other information: Featured on Restaurant Makeover and *Diners, Drive-Ins and Dives

Rosedale Diner was a diner in Toronto, Ontario, Canada. The restaurant closed after operating for approximately 45 years. It was featured on the Canadian reality television series Restaurant Makeover as well as the Food Network.

== See also ==
- List of diners
- List of Diners, Drive-Ins and Dives episodes
- List of restaurants in Canada
