= Studio =

Artist or worker's workroom

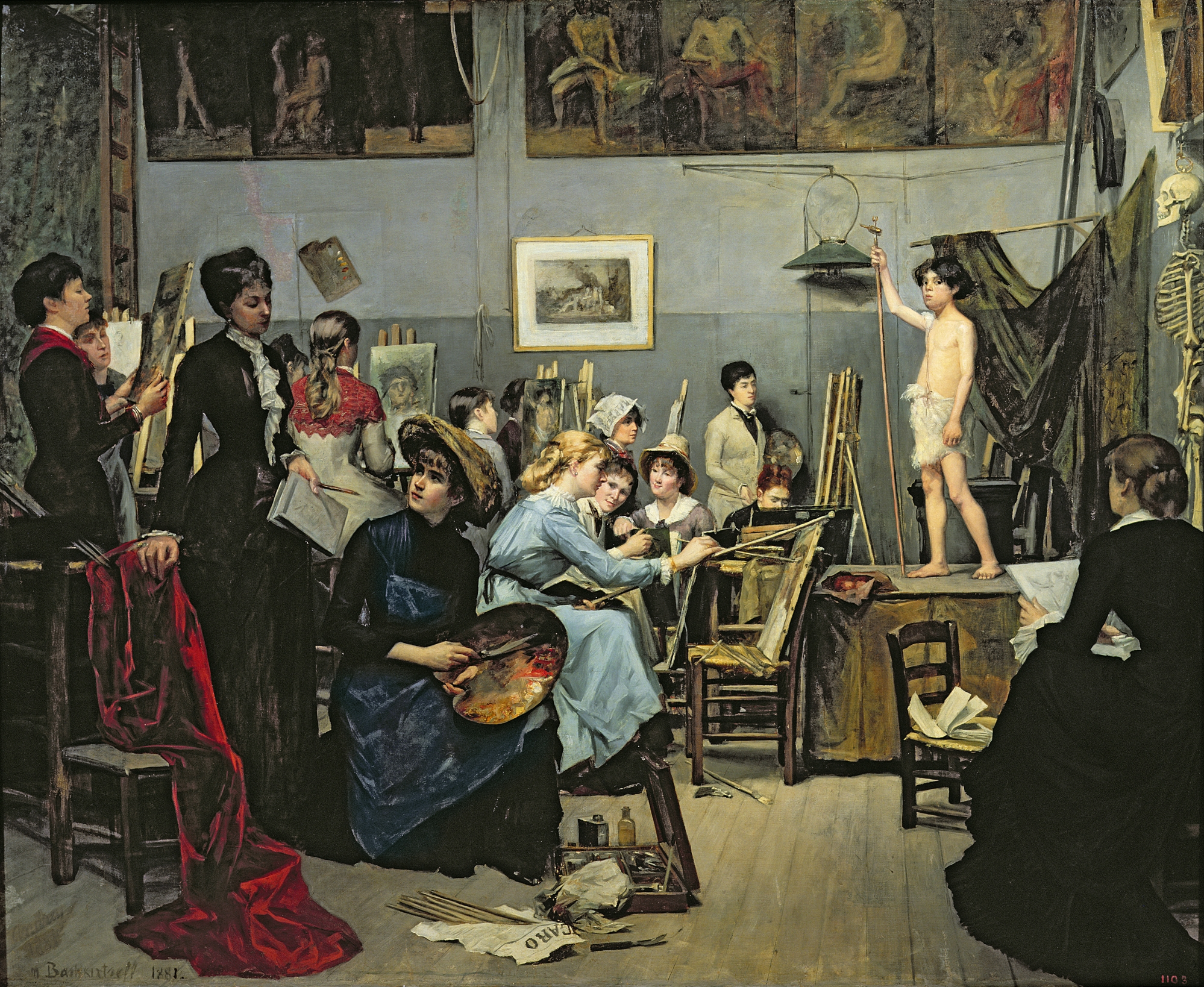
- In the Studio, by Marie Bashkirtseff, 1881, oil on canvas, Dnipro State Art Museum, Dnipro, Ukraine.
- Purpose: A space set aside for creative work of any kind, including art, dance, music and theater.
- Concept: An "office" for artists

A studio is a space set aside for creative work of any kind, including art, dance, music and theater.

The word studio is derived from the Italian: studio, from Latin: studium, from studere, meaning to study or zeal.

== Types ==
=== Art ===
The studio of any artist, especially from the 15th to the 19th centuries, characterized all the assistants, thus the designation of paintings as "from the workshop of..." or "studio of..."

An art studio is sometimes called an "atelier", especially in earlier eras. In contemporary, English language use, "atelier" can also refer to the Atelier Method, a training method for artists that usually takes place in a professional artist's studio.

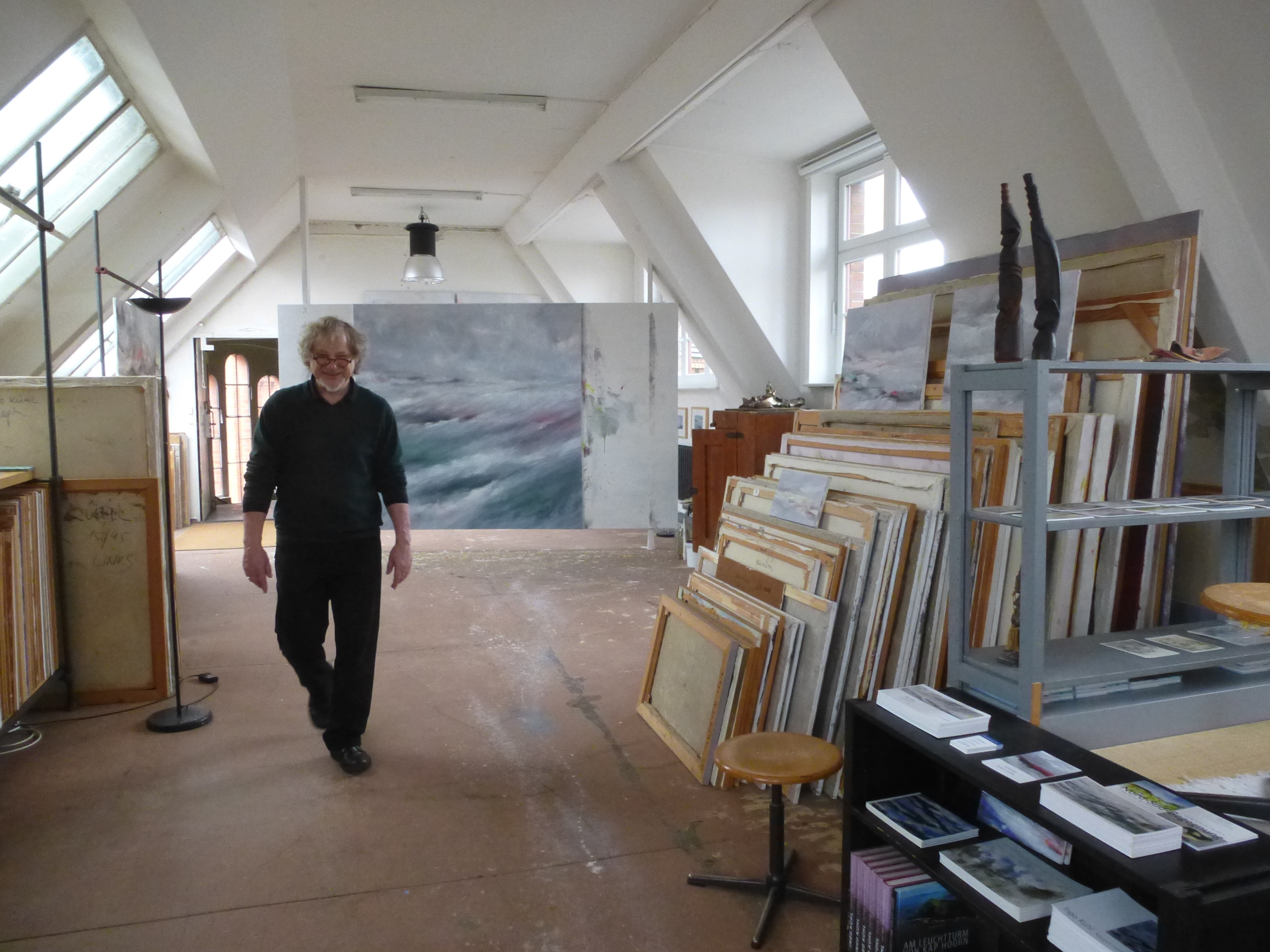
Ingo Kühl at his Berlin studio 2015

The above-mentioned "method" calls upon that zeal for study to play a significant role in the production which occurs in a studio space. A studio is more or less artful to the degree that the artist who occupies it is committed to the continuing education in their formal discipline. Academic curricula categorize studio classes in order to prepare students for the rigors of building sets of skills which require a continuity of practice in order to achieve growth and mastery of their artistic expression. A versatile and creative mind will embrace the opportunity of such practice to innovate and experiment, which develops uniquely individual qualities of each artist's expression. Thus the method raises and maintains an art studio space above the level of a mere production facility or workshop.

Safety is or may be a concern in studios, with some painting materials required to be handled, stored, or used properly to prevent poisoning, chemical burns, or fire.

=== Educational ===
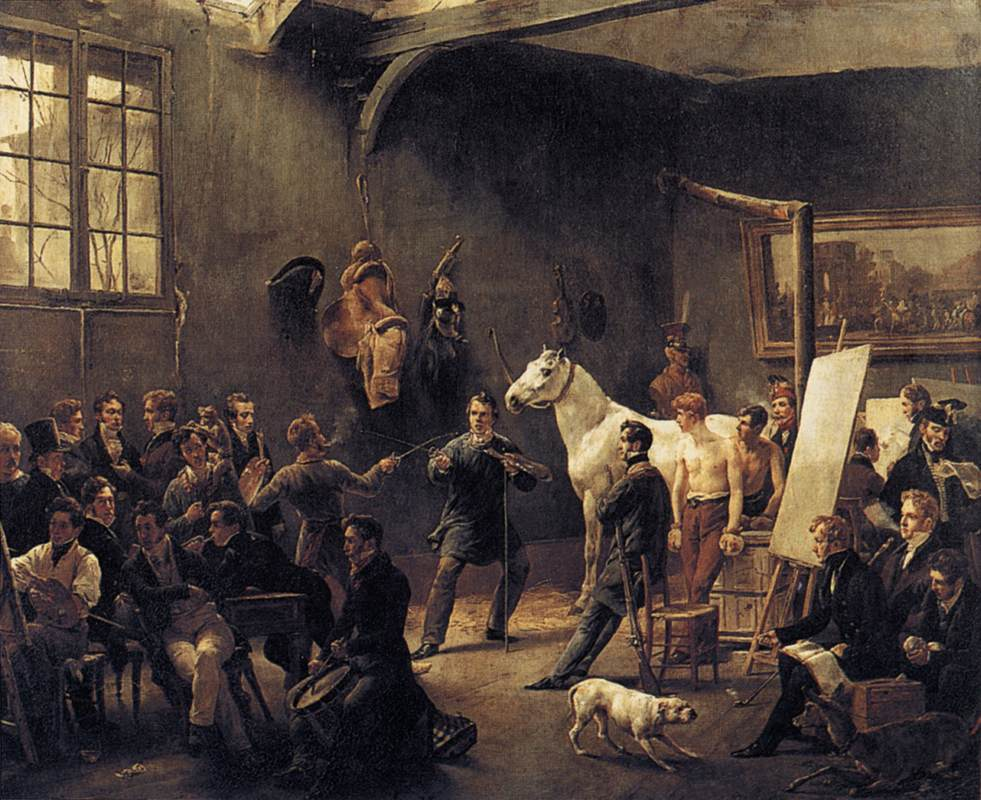
L'Atelier by Horace Vernet, 1821

In educational studios, students learn to develop skills related to design, ranging from architecture to product design. In specific, educational studios are studio settings where large numbers of students learn to draft and design with instructional help at a college. Educational studios are colloquially referred to as "studio" by students, who are known for staying up late hours into the night doing projects and socializing.

The studio environment is characterized by two types in education:

1. The workspace where students do usually visually-centered work in an open environment. This time and space is beyond that of instructional time and faculty guidance is not available. It allows for students to engage each other, help each other, and inspire each other while working.
2. A type of class that takes the above-mentioned workshop space, and recreates its core component of an open working environment. It differentiates itself based on a topic of instruction, isolated space, instructor led/included, and an added focus of directed criticism.

=== Pottery ===
Studio pottery is made by an individual potter working on his own in his studio, rather than in a ceramics factory (although there may be a design studio within a larger manufacturing site).

=== Production ===
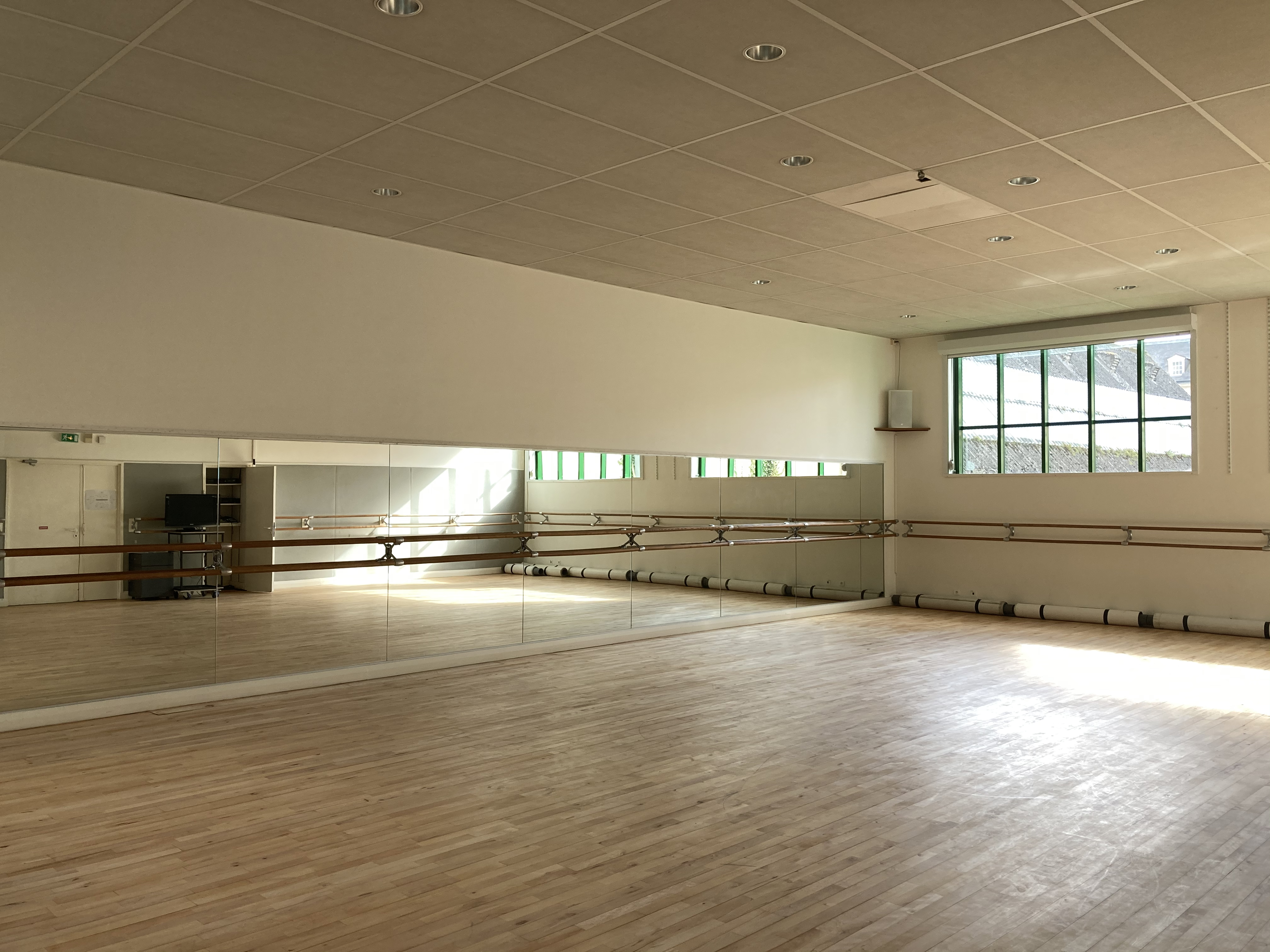
Dance studio with barre rails, mirrors, and mounted speakers

Production studios are those studios which act as centres for the production in any of the arts; alternatively they can also be the financial and commercial entity behind such endeavours. In radio and television, a production studio is the place where programs and radio commercial and television advertising are recorded for further emission.

=== Animation ===
Animation studios, like movie studios, may be production facilities, or financial entities. In some cases, especially in anime, they continue the tradition of a studio where a master or group of talented individuals oversee the work of lesser artists and crafts persons in realising their vision. Animation studios are a fast rising entity and they include established firms such as Walt Disney and Pixar.

=== Comics ===
A comics studio is a workroom or entertainment company that makes comics. Comics creators, employ small studios of staff to assist in the creation of a comic strip, comic book or graphic novel.

In the early days of "Dan Dare", Frank Hampson employed a number of staff at his studio to help with the production of the strip. Eddie Campbell is another creator who has assembled a small studio of colleagues to help him in his art, and the comic book industry in the United States has based its production methods upon the studio system employed at its beginnings.

Another type of studio, common for instance in Spain, would produce work for-hire on license, with prospective buyers bringing in their own franchises for artwork and occasionally new stories.

=== Instructional ===
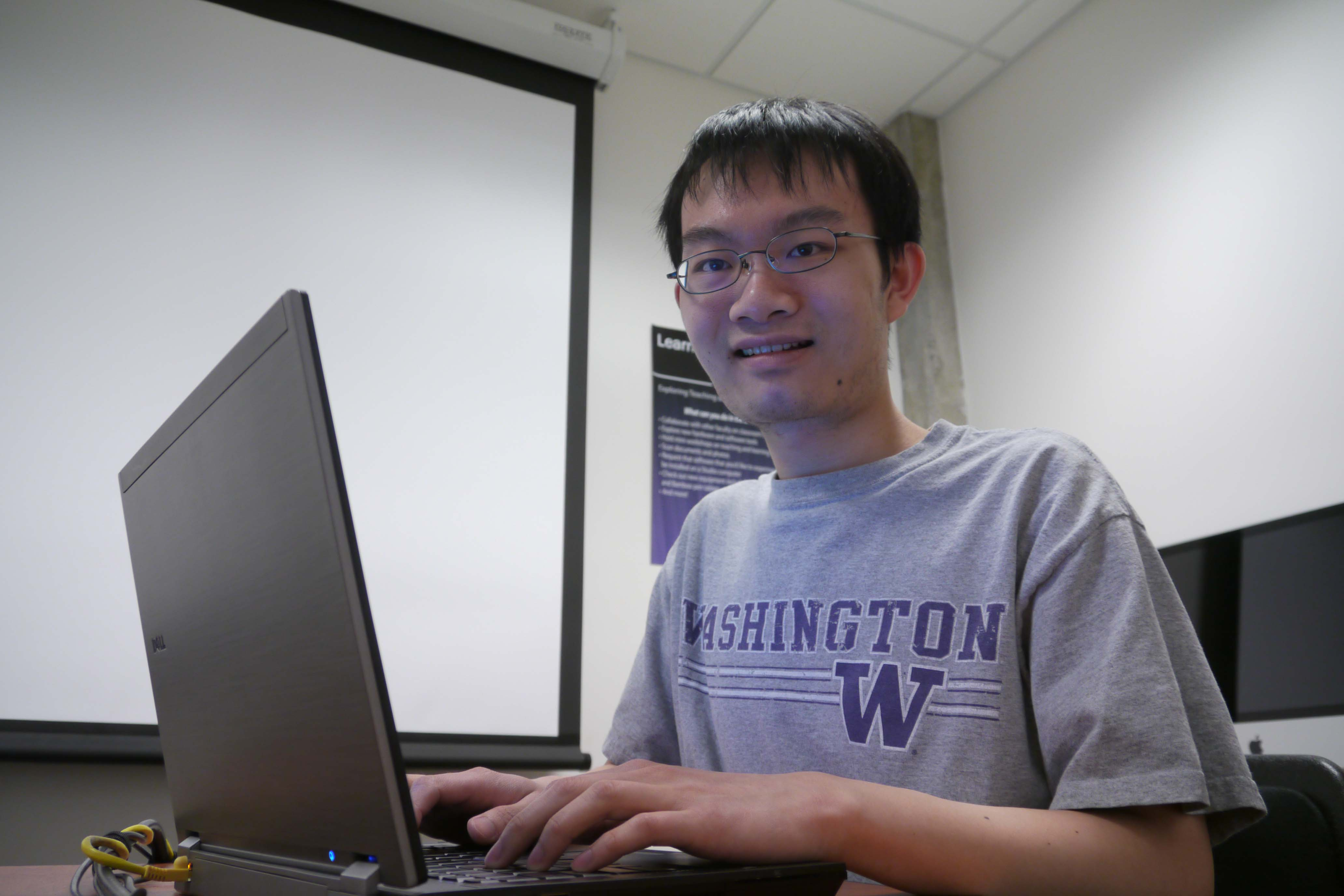
Student using a laptop in an instructional studio.

Many universities are creating studio settings for courses outside the artist's realm. There are several different projects along these lines, most notably the SCALE-UP (Student-Centered Active Learning Environment for Undergraduate Programs) initiated at NC State.

=== Mastering ===
In audio, a mastering studio is a facility specialised in audio mastering. Tasks may include but not be limited to audio restoration, corrective and tone-shaping EQ, dynamic control, stereo or 5.1 surround editing, vinyl and tape transfers, vinyl cutting, and CD compilation. Depending on the quality of the original mix, the mastering engineer's role can change from small corrections to improving the overall sound of a mix drastically. Typically studios contain a combination of high-end analogue equipment with low-noise circuitry and digital hardware and plug-ins. Some may contain tape machines and disc cutting lathes. They may also contain full-range monitoring systems and be acoustically tuned to provide an accurate reproduction of the sound information contained in the original medium. The mastering engineer must prepare the file for its intended destination, which may be radio, CD, vinyl or digital distribution.

In video production, a mastering studio is a facility specialized in the post-production of video recordings. Tasks may include but not be limited to: video editing, colour grading correction, mixing, DVD authoring and audio mastering. The mastering engineer must prepare the file for its intended destination, which may be broadcast, DVD or digital distribution.

=== Acting ===
An "acting studio" is an institution or workspace (similar to a dance studio) in which actors rehearse and refine their craft. The Neighborhood Playhouse and Actors Studio are legendary acting studios in New York.

=== Movie ===
A movie studio is a company which develops, equips and maintains a controlled environment for filmmaking. This environment may be interior (sound stage), exterior (backlot) or both.

=== Photographic ===
A photographic studio is both a workspace and a corporate body. As a workspace it provides space to take, develop, print and duplicate photographs.

=== Radio ===
A radio studio is a room in which a radio program or show is produced, either for live broadcast or for recording for a later broadcast. The room is soundproofed to avoid unwanted noise being mixed into the broadcast.

=== Recording ===
A recording studio is a facility for sound recording which generally consists of at least two rooms: the studio or live room, and the control room, where the sound from the studio is recorded and manipulated. They are designed so that they have good acoustics and so that there is good isolation between the rooms.

=== Television ===
A television studio is an installation in which television or video productions take place, for live television, for recording video tape, or for the acquisition of raw footage for post-production. The design of a studio is similar to, and derived from, movie studios, with a few amendments for the special requirements of television production. A professional television studio generally has several rooms, which are kept separate for noise and practicality reasons.

=== Zen, yoga, and martial arts ===
Many healing arts and activities such as Zen, yoga, judo and karate are "studied" in a studio. It is widespread to see yoga studios and martial arts studios established in settings that might previously have been for other uses, described as studios. These are not recreational centers or gyms in the traditional sense, but places where students of these activities practice or study their art.

== See also ==
- Workshop
- Hackspace
- Fab lab
