= Atelier (disambiguation) =

An atelier is the workshop of an artist or architect.

Atelier or l'Atelier may also refer to:

- Atelier (video game series), a video game series by Gust Corporation
- Atelier (TV series), a Japanese/American series distributed by Netflix
- Atelier (building), a residential condominium skyscraper located in Midtown Manhattan
- Atelier (Chicago restaurant)
- Atelier (Ottawa restaurant)

== See also ==
- Théâtre de l'Atelier, Paris
- Éditions de l'Atelier, a French publishing house founded as Éditions Ouvrières in 1939
- Atelier Bow-Wow, a Tokyo-based architecture firm
- Den Atelier, a Luxembourg music venue
- Atelier 801, a French video game developer
- Witch Hat Atelier, a Japanese manga series by Kamome Shirahama
