= DaNico =

Italian restaurant in Toronto, Ontario, Canada

- Interactive map of DaNico

Restaurant information
- Food type: Italian
- Location: Toronto, Canada
- Coordinates: 43.6567°N 79.4076°W

DaNico is a Michelin-starred Italian restaurant in Toronto, Ontario, Canada.

== Recognition ==
=== Canada's 100 Best Restaurants Ranking ===
DaNico
Year	Rank	Change
2025	59	new
2026	38	▲21

== See also ==
- List of Italian restaurants
- List of Michelin-starred restaurants in Toronto
