= Soif Bar à vin =

Wine Bar in Gatineau, Quebec, Canada

- Interactive map of Soif Bar à vin

Restaurant information
- Established: 2014
- Owner: Veronique Rivest
- Head chef: Erik Brooman
- Food type: Canadian; Wine Bar
- Location: 88 Rue Montcalm, Gatineau, Quebec, Canada
- Coordinates: 45°25′39.25″N 75°43′28.31″W
- Seating capacity: 65
- Website: www.soifbaravin.ca

Soif Bar à vin (English: Thirst Wine Bar) is a restaurant and wine bar located in the Hull district of Gatineau, Quebec.

== History ==
The business was established in 2014 by sommelier Véronique Rivest, a two-time winner of Canada's Best Sommelier and the runner-up in the 2013 World's Best Sommelier competition. Prior to opening Soif, Rivest served as the head sommelier at nearby fine dining restaurant Les Fougères in Chelsea, Quebec.

The restaurant's name, Soif is the French word to be thirsty. The restaurant's design was handled by the Montreal firm Cabinet Braun-Braën, with a strong focus on wine. This theme is reflected in the interior, where cork is used to line the walls, ceiling, and bar.

Soif's wine list, featuring around 120 bottles, changes almost weekly and places a strong emphasis on local selections. Rivest describes her philosophy for selecting wines at the restaurant to be simple: they just have to taste good. Rivest’s approach at Soif challenges traditional wine bar conventions, emphasizing enjoyment over rigid rules. She encourages guests to “rinse with wine” rather than change glasses between tastings, a practice some consider a faux pas. She also rejects the idea that certain foods can’t pair well with wine, believing that experimentation is part of the fun. Her stance on natural wines follows the same philosophy—she avoids dogma, instead championing wines that authentically express their terroir without blindly defending flawed bottles.

Rivest sought to create a wine bar with a complementary food menu, guided by the business's motto, “Wine without food is just sad!”. The establishment offers a seasonally rotating selection of small plates, with most ingredients sourced from Quebec. Jamie Stunt served as the head chef in the first years of its operation. Stunt later left to open his own restaurant and wine bar concept across the river in Ottawa - Arlo Wine & Restaurant. As of March 2025, Erik Brooman serves as the executive chef.

It seats 65 individuals indoors, as well as additional 65 outdoors in summer months.

== Recognition ==
The restaurant was ranked #10 in Air Canada's annual list of 10 best new restaurants in Canada in 2015.

Condé Nast magazine praised Soif as an essential stop for wine lovers, highlighting owner Véronique Rivest’s expertise and commitment to accessibility. The review noted the ever-evolving wine list, curated to surprise and challenge the palate, as well as the restaurant's seasonal small plates designed to complement the wines. It also commended the knowledgeable service, with every server trained as a sommelier, and the inviting atmosphere that makes high-quality wine appreciation approachable.

Reviewing the business in 2015, Ottawa Citizen restaurant critic Peter Hum praised Soif for its knowledgeable service, well-curated wine selection, and refined yet approachable small plates by then-chef Jamie Stunt. He highlighted the kitchen’s emphasis on fresh, high-quality ingredients, particularly its vegetable-focused dishes, as well as standout offerings like preserved fish and well-sauced meats. While most dishes were well-executed, he noted that some, such as the bison tartare, could have benefited from bolder seasoning.

Eater listed Soif among its "24 Best Restaurants in [the Ottawa area]," highlighting the restaurant's wine list, bison tartare, and local cheeses from Quebec.

=== Canada's 50 Best Bars Ranking ===
Soif was included in the inaugural Canada's 50 Best Bars list in 2018, ranking 14th nationwide. In 2019, it dropped to 38th before falling off the list in subsequent years. It was the highest-ranked bar in the Ottawa-Gatineau region during both years it appeared on the list.

Soif Bar à vin
Year	Rank	Change
2018	14	new
2019	38	▼24
2020	▼ No Rank	
2021	No List	
2022	▼ No Rank	
2023	▼ No Rank	
2024	▼ No Rank	
2025	▼ No Rank	
