= Perch (restaurant) =

Restaurant in Ottawa, Ontario, Canada

- Interactive map of Perch

Restaurant information
- Established: November 1, 2021
- Owner: Justin Champagne-Lagarde
- Head chef: Justin Champagne-Lagarde
- Food type: Canadian
- Location: 300 Preston St., Ottawa, Ontario, Canada
- Coordinates: 45°24′12.83″N 75°42′40.69″W
- Seating capacity: 26
- Website: www.perchottawa.ca

Perch is a restaurant located in the Centretown West neighbourhood of Ottawa, Ontario.

== History ==
The business was opened in 2021 by chef-owner Justin Champagne-Lagarde. Before founding Perch, Champagne-Lagarde was the sous-chef at Atelier, a restaurant renowned for its use of molecular gastronomy and frequently ranked among the best in Canada.

The restaurant's name, Perch, is both a nod to the local fish and a symbolic reference to the business's origins — taking over a property where another restaurant once stood, now offering a place for its culinary successor to take flight.

== Concept ==
Since its opening, Champagne-Lagarde has introduced several iterations of Perch's dining format. Initially, the restaurant offered a five-course tasting menu during an early seating and a nine-course menu later in the evening. It also split the restaurant between a main 'dining area' and a 'lounge area', with the former offering the tasting menu and the latter offering a la carte dining and cocktails. As of 2025, Perch has unified its dining areas and exclusively offers a nine-course tasting menu, as well as an optional beverage pairing consisting of a mix of wines and cocktails.

Perch is also noted for its commitment to sustainability and minimizing food waste in the kitchen. The restaurant incorporates byproducts and trimmings from meal preparation into the menu, such as in a consommé made from kitchen scraps. Champagne-Lagarde has stated his goal of a zero-waste philosophy in informing the restaurant's approach to fine dining.

== Recognition ==
The restaurant was ranked #4 in Air Canada's annual list of 10 best new restaurants in Canada in 2022. Perch's green initiatives, including its composting and upcycling of ingredients was highlighted.

Restaurant critic Peter Hum, writing for the Ottawa Citizen, praised Perch as "among the small and rarefied ranks of Ottawa's high-end tasting-menu restaurants," highlighting its sophisticated, creative nine-course menu and calling it a memorable and exhilarating dining experience.

In 2023, the restaurant reservation system OpenTable rated Perch among the 100 best restaurants in Canada, which are available on its application.

The online media outlet Narcity Ottawa has identified Perch as one of the few restaurants in the city that it considers potentially worthy of a Michelin star, should the Michelin Guide begin reviewing establishments in Ottawa.

=== Canada's 100 Best Restaurants Ranking ===
Perch debuted on Canada's 100 Best Restaurants list in 2023, at #85. As of 2025, the restaurant is ranked #95.

Perch
Year	Rank	Change
2023	85	new
2024	▼ No Rank	
2025	95	▲ re-entry
