= Cuisine AuntDai =

Chinese restaurant in Montreal

Coordinates: 45°29′40″N 73°34′49″W

Cuisine AuntDai is a Chinese restaurant in Montreal, Quebec famous for its owner's menu item descriptions, which are at turns disarmingly self-effacing, autobiographical, and advisory.

The restaurant opened in February 2014. It serves Northeastern Chinese regional cuisine and is owned by Feigang Fei, who immigrated to Montreal from China in 2006. It is known for its mala dishes. Fei previously worked in information technology, where he says he was told to be more diplomatic in criticizing co-workers' work.

In February 2019 Cuisine AuntDai was recommended by Global News for Valentine's Day dining. In January 2021, the restaurant became well known because of its menu item descriptions. According to the New York Times, Fei's menu "in addition to its disarming frankness" is also autobiographical. He mentions that one dish was one of his favorites while in college, but that he's "not such a huge fan of the restaurant's version, to be honest" and prefers the original at Tianjin University. Some menu item descriptions offer advice; the one for the hot-and-sour soup says, "Spicy and tasty, no meat, drink slowly to avoid hiccups." Fei started adding such advice because of frustration with customers who returned dishes that weren't what they expected. Fei occasionally describes a dish in complimentary terms, such as the braised pork belly with sweet potato, the description of which is "You almost want to sniff the tasty hot air above this beautiful dish."

The restaurant had been "bleeding cash" during the coronavirus pandemic before a customer tweeted the menu in January 2021 along with a comment about the restaurant's "extremely honest" owner. The tweet went viral, and shortly thereafter the restaurant could "barely keep up with demand for [its] takeout meals." Fei was interviewed by media in Australia, Britain, Germany, Israel and the United States, as well as Canadian media.
