= Colonnade Pizza =

Pizza restaurant in Ottawa, Ontario, Canada

- Interactive map of Colonnade Pizza

Restaurant information
- Established: 1967
- Owners: Kalil Dahdouh; Peter Dahdouh
- Food type: Pizza
- Location: 280 Metcalfe St., Ottawa, Ontario, Canada
- Coordinates: 45°24′56.85″N 75°41′29.36″W
- Other locations: 5
- Website: www.colonnadepizza.com

A large, half plain, half Canadian (pepperoni, bacon and mushroom) pizza from the Colonnade

Colonnade Pizza is a small chain of dine-in and takeout pizza restaurants located in Ottawa, Ontario.

== History ==
The restaurant was opened at its long standing Metcalfe Street location in 1967 by Lebanese-Canadian immigrant Kalil Dahdouh. Dahdouh first arrived to Ottawa from Lebanon in 1959, and saved money to open the restaurant.

It is considered one of the more popular spots for Ottawa-style pizza in the city. Ottawa-style pizza is influenced by the city's large Lebanese immigrant population. The style of pizza known for often being eaten by fork and knife, being greasy, having sweeter sauce, crispy, thick cheese, a thick crust, and toppings under the cheese.

Instead of using mozzarella to top the pizzas like most restaurants, Colonnade sources brine-salted brick cheese from Oak Grove Cheese Factory located in Southwestern Ontario. The process to make the pizza's sauce and dough has been kept a family secret, with only three individuals knowing the process. The dough is made using traditional Lebanese bread making processes.

Colonnade also served as a jumping-off point for former staff who went on to open their own Ottawa-style pizza joints, including Moe Atallah's Newport Restaurant.

Peter Dahdouh, son of founder Kalil Dahdouh, currently oversees the restaurant's operations and has led its expansion to five other locations across the city.

== Recognition ==
In 2024, Ottawa Citizen restaurant critic Peter Hum described Colonnade as an iconic Ottawa brand. While praising the nostalgia and signature cheese, he noted that the pizzas felt somewhat lacking in sauce and seasoning, with the Colonnade special appearing soggier than the others. In 1986, the Citizen's then restaurant critic Shirley Foley wrote the pizza was “as it should be: piping hot, lots of green pepper, pepperoni, mushrooms, runny cheese, with a crust that let you know who was boss."

Maclean's Magazine described Colonnade as "an Ottawa institution."

The restaurant gained a reputation as a popular spot for politicians in the city. Former Canadian Prime Ministers Kim Campbell and Stephen Harper were noted as regulars at the restaurant.

Actress Annie Murphy, who grew up in Ottawa, lauded Colonnade as her "favourite pizza in the entire world" and "would be [her] last meal request."
