= Surly Bob =

19th century children's book by Luisa C. Silke

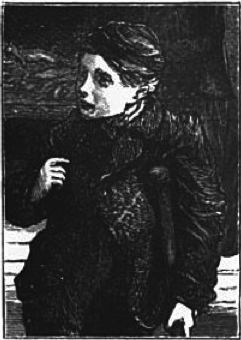
Illustration of Surly Bob from Surly Bob by Luisa C. Silke, 1881 page 9.

Surly Bob is a 19th-century English children's novel by Luisa C. Silke. It was a melodrama about a nasty boy who nonetheless had great affection for his crippled little brother. It was published as one of Cassell's “Shilling Series” of illustrated children's books and was notable in its day for its pathos, character development and illustrations. It was originally published in serial form in the British periodical The Quiver. and was considered at the time to be one its principal stories.

The first episode in the series was published in 1875. The novel was published in book form in 1881.
