= J&R Kosher Meat and Delicatessen =

J&R Kosher
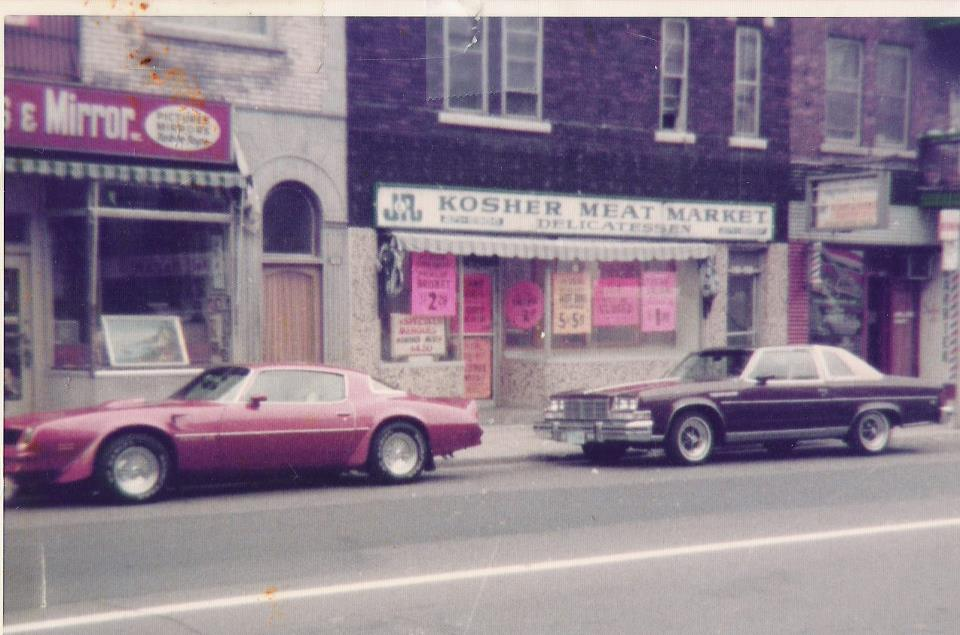
- J&R Kosher's old storefront

- Location within Montreal

Restaurant information
- Established: 1952
- Food type: Jewish kosher style delicatessen
- Dress code: Casual
- Location: 5800 Cavendish, Montreal, Quebec, H4W 2T5, Canada
- Coordinates: 45°28′34.15″N 73°39′57.57″W
- Website: J&R Kosher (official site)

J&R Kosher Meat and Delicatessen was a Montreal kosher butcher and delicatessen established in 1952 by Robert Nemes, a Holocaust survivor and immigrant from Romania. Its last location was at 5800 Cavendish Blvd in the heart of the city's Jewish community. J&R was the oldest and one of the most famous remaining kosher meat shops in Montreal. The store delivered its meat throughout Quebec and Ontario, and shipped throughout the rest of Canada. The business closed in 2022.

== History ==
Shortly after immigrating to Canada from Romania, Nemes worked in a meat packing house during the day and at Schwartz's at night. He used his savings and a $400 loan to launch the business. As the company expanded, his son Sidney joined the business.

In 1978, to conform to Quebec's Bill 101, the store changed its name to Boucherie et Charcuterie Kascher J&R.

In 1991, J&R Kosher relocated from its original location at Van Horne and Wiseman Avenue to the Cavendish Mall in Cote St. Luc, Quebec.

In 1996, the Van Horne store location was closed and all operations were transferred to the Cavendish Mall location, which was expanded to include two-floors, a full kitchen, an elevator, a smokehouse, and three coolers over 10,000 square feet.

In late December 2022 J&R closed due to rising kosher beef prices and overall inflation.

In March 2026, Aleph Meats was opened by Mendy Boyarsky in the former J&R location, bringing on Sidney Nemes as a consultant to help continue J&R’s original mission while working to combat rising kosher meat prices.

== See also ==
- Kosher meat
- List of Ashkenazi Jewish restaurants
- List of delicatessens
