= Don Alfonso 1890 =

Restaurant in Toronto, Ontario, Canada

- Interactive map of Don Alfonso 1890

Restaurant information
- Established: June 27, 2018
- Head chef: Alfonso Iaccarino
- Food type: Italian
- Rating: (Michelin Guide)
- Location: 1 Harbour Square 38th Floor, Toronto, M5J 1A6, Canada
- Coordinates: 43°38′28″N 79°22′32″W
- Website: www.donalfonsotoronto.com

Don Alfonso 1890 is an Italian restaurant in Toronto, Ontario, Canada.

== History ==
Don Alfonso 1890 is the sister location to the one Michelin-starred restaurant of the same name on the Amalfi coast. The Toronto location initially opened in 2018 in the historic Consumer's Gas Building located in the Financial District, Toronto of Downtown Toronto, led by Chef Saverio Macri.

After a brief move to Casa Loma during the COVID-19 pandemic, the restaurant relocated in June 2022 to its current home on the 38th floor of the Westin Harbour Castle hotel in downtown Toronto. The restaurant's Westin location is on Toronto's waterfront, offering 360 degree views of the city's skyline.

== Recognition ==
The restaurant has received a Michelin star in Toronto's inaugural 2022 Michelin Guide, and retained it in each addition following.

It was named the Best Italian Restaurant in the World, outside of Italy, by Italian magazine 50 Top Italy in 2022.

=== Canada's 100 Best Restaurants Ranking ===
Don Alfonso 1890
Year	Rank	Change
2019	49	new
2020	36	▲13
2021	No List	
2022	28	▲8
2023	35	▼7
2024	81	▼46
2025	70	▲11
2026	85	▼15

== See also ==
- List of Italian restaurants
- List of Michelin-starred restaurants in Toronto
