= Enigma Yorkville =

Restaurant in Toronto, Ontario, Canada

- Interactive map of Enigma Yorkville

Restaurant information
- Head chef: Quinton Bennett
- Chef: Kane Van EE
- Pastry chef: Sarah Tsai
- Rating: (Michelin Guide)
- Location: 23 Saint Thomas Street, Toronto, M5S 3E7, Canada
- Coordinates: 43°40′8″N 79°23′26″W
- Website: www.enigmayorkville.com

Enigma Yorkville is a restaurant in Toronto, Ontario, Canada. The restaurant has received a Michelin star.

== Recognition ==
=== Canada's 100 Best Restaurants Ranking ===
Enigma Yorkville
Year	Rank	Change
2022	80	new
2023	▼ No Rank	
2024	▼ No Rank	
2025	▼ No Rank	
2026	82	▲ re-entry

== See also ==
- List of Michelin-starred restaurants in Toronto
