= Aburi Hana =

Restaurant in Toronto, Ontario, Canada

- Interactive map of Aburi Hana

Restaurant information
- Established: January 2020
- Owner: Seigo Nakamura
- Head chef: Aiko Uchigoshi
- Chef: So Sakata
- Food type: Japanese
- Rating: (Michelin Guide)
- Location: 102 Yorkville Avenue, Toronto, Ontario, M5R 1B9, Canada
- Coordinates: 43°40′16.1″N 79°23′33.1″W
- Website: www.aburihana.com

Aburi Hana is a Japanese restaurant in Toronto, Ontario, Canada. The restaurant has received a Michelin star.

== History ==
The restaurant was opened by the Aburi Restaurant Group in January 2020, offering a kaiseki-style tasting menu.

At its opening, the restaurant's kitchen was led by chef Ryusuke Nakagawa, who was recruited from Japan by the restaurant group to serve as Aburi Hana's head chef.

The business temporarily closed in September 2025 following Nakagawa's departure back to Japan, and re-opened a year later in September 2026 following renovations and a change in concept. At its re-opening the restaurant turned to serving a la carte Edo-era Japanese cuisine. Aburi Hana's former pastry chef, Aiko Uchigoshi, was named executive chef for the new concept.

== Recognition ==
Aburi Hana was awarded a Michelin star in Toronto's inaugural Michelin Guide that was revealed in 2022, and has retained its star in every year since. Michelin praised chef Nakagawa's "modern take on [a] history-steeped Kyō-Kaiseki menu".

=== Canada's 100 Best Restaurants Ranking ===
Aburi Hana
Year	Rank	Change
2022	99	new
2023	▼ No Rank	
2024	33	▲ re-entry
2025	29	▲4
2026	▼ No Rank	

== See also ==
- List of Japanese restaurants
- List of Michelin-starred restaurants in Toronto
