= North & Navy =

Restaurant in Ottawa, Ontario, Canada

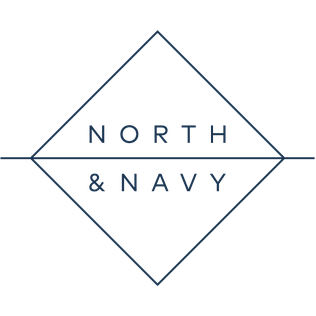
- Interactive map of North & Navy

Restaurant information
- Established: February 13, 2015
- Owners: Christopher Schlesak; Adam Vettorel
- Head chef: Adam Vettorel
- Food type: Italian
- Location: 226 Nepean St., Ottawa, Ontario, Canada
- Coordinates: 45°25′0.33″N 75°41′57.73″W
- Seating capacity: 55
- Website: northandnavy.com

North & Navy is an Italian restaurant located in the Centretown neighbourhood of Ottawa, Ontario.

== History ==
The restaurant was opened in February 2015 by business partners Christopher Schlesak and Adam Vettorel. Vettorel also serves as the restaurant's head chef.

The owners of North & Navy sought a name that would intentionally distinguish their establishment from these restaurants while emphasizing its focus on northern Italian cuisine, ultimately selecting North & Navy.

In January 2022, Ottawa was subject to a three-week occupation of its downtown by demonstrators opposing COVID-19 vaccine mandates and restrictions. The protest, initially led by truckers, evolved into a broader anti-government movement, causing significant disruptions to residents and businesses in the city’s core. Counter-protesters emerged in response, including individuals who gained online recognition for their actions against the convoy, such as by obstructing vehicles attempting to expand the occupation. As the protest ended and businesses began reopening, North & Navy expressed appreciation for the counter-protesters and invited several "internet famous" figures in the counter-protest to dine at their establishment free of charge.

== Concept ==
While most Italian restaurants in the Ottawa area primarily feature cuisine from southern Italy, North & Navy sought to replicate the ambiance and design of a bacaro - a traditional Venetian wine bar - and specializes in Venetian cuisine, emphasizing small plates and regional flavours.

From its conception until early 2025, North & Navy foregoed a tasting menu, instead serving its cuisine a la carte. In May 2025, the restaurant began offering the option of a tasting menu to guests.

== Recognition ==
Peter Hum, restaurant critic for the Ottawa Citizen, praised North & Navy for its refined take on Venetian cuisine, highlighting its creative approach to small plates and house-made pastas. He noted that while the menu steers away from the tomato-heavy Italian dishes common in Ottawa, it offers well-executed, culturally specific fare to the Venetian region, such as cicchetti, bigoli, and torteletti. Hum also commended the restaurant’s inviting ambiance and knowledgeable service, describing it as a unique addition to the city’s dining scene.

Montreal-based culinary magazine Tastet praised the restaurant as a must-visit Italian restaurant in Ottawa, offering refined Northern Italian cuisine with top-quality Canadian ingredients. Highlighting the fresh house-made pasta and expertly crafted cocktails.

In 2025, restaurant reservation system OpenTable ranked North & Navy among the 100 most romantic spots to dine at in Canada, which are available on its application.

=== Canada's 100 Best Restaurants Ranking ===
North & Navy has occasionally ranked on Canada's 100 Best Restaurants list since its opening. It reached a peak of #40 in Canada in the 2022 publication. As of 2024, the restaurant was ranked #95.

North & Navy
Year	Rank	Change
2018	74	new
2019	▼ No Rank	
2020	▼ No Rank	
2021	No List	
2022	40	▲ re-entry
2023	96	▼56
2024	95	▲1
2025	▼ No Rank	
2026	▼ No Rank	
