= Ethel's Lounge =

Bar in Waterloo, Canada

Coordinates: 43.4692°N 80.5232°W

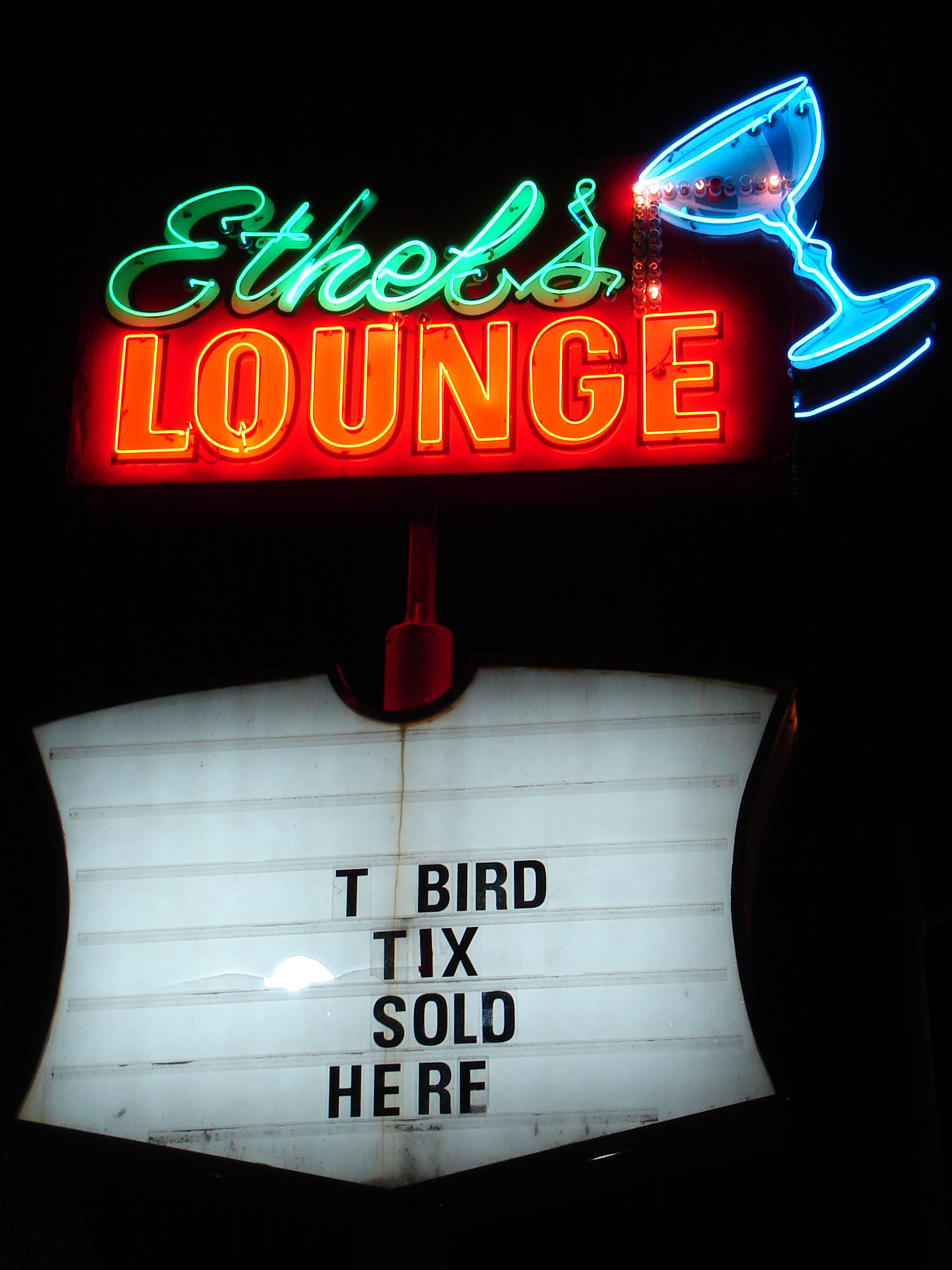
The bar's neon sign at night, 2005.

Ethel's Lounge is a bar in uptown Waterloo, the central business district of Waterloo, Ontario, Canada. It is located at 114 King St N.

== History ==
Restaurateur Glenn Smith had previously run the blues club Pop the Gator (1989–1994) and the bar Circus Room (1992–1994). Smith opened Ethel's Lounge in 1994. Smith picked the location for its desirable location in the city, as well as its parking. Smith wanted the food to feel home-cooked, as opposed to typical bar food. Every year, the bar runs the "Tray Race", a relay race for charity where contestants balance trays of water bottles. On St. Patrick's Day 2019, a concert poster was stolen from the bar. The bar has been described as a "local favourite".

== Decoration ==
The bar's decor has stayed relatively the same since its opening in 1994. Smith was inspired by American dive bars from the 1950s to 70s, and named the bar after a 70s blues bar of the same name in Detroit. Adam Jackson of the Waterloo Chronicle described it as "a time machine of sorts". The bar is decorated with concert posters, pop culture and pieces of local history, such as John Belushi’s shoes and socks. The bar's neon sign, taken from the Detroit Ethel's Lounge, has been described as "iconic".
