= Riviera (restaurant) =

Restaurant in Ottawa, Ontario, Canada

- Interactive map of Riviera

Restaurant information
- Established: July 29, 2016
- Owners: Matthew Carmichael; Jordan Holley
- Head chef: Jordan Holley
- Food type: Contemporary
- Location: 62 Sparks Street, Ottawa, Ontario, Canada
- Coordinates: 45°25′23.63″N 75°41′47.57″W
- Seating capacity: 105
- Website: dineriviera.com

Riviera is a contemporary restaurant in the Downtown neighbourhood of Ottawa, Ontario.

== History ==
The restaurant opened in the summer of 2016, occupying a former Art Deco building built in 1869 that previously served as the Ottawa headquarters of the Canadian Imperial Bank of Commerce. It was opened by chef-owners Matthew Carmichael and Jordan Holley, as part of the York Street Entertainment restaurant group.

The owners kept much of the building's original design features, including its 50-foot white plaster tray ceiling and marble floors and panel walls. Other design features for the restaurant, such as the chandeliers and brass bar area, were created by local interior design company Linebox Studio. The former bank's two vaults were also re-purposed, with one serving as the restaurant's wine cellar and kitchen, and other converted into communal washrooms.

In August 2018, Riviera hosted an unexpected visit from Boyne Lester Johnston, a former bank teller who, in 1958, had stolen $260,000 from the same building when it operated as a branch of the Imperial Bank of Canada. Johnston, then 85, toured the restaurant with staff, recounting details of the heist and his subsequent 17-day flight across the United States before his capture. His visit concluded in Riviera's wine cellar - formerly the bank's vault - where he signed the wall with his name, the date, and his former prisoner number. The visit attracted international news coverage, including from the British Broadcasting Corporation and the New York Times.

== Concept ==
The owners cited the vision of the restaurant was to be "casual fine dining", where individuals would be comfortable showing up in a suit or jeans and a t-shirt. It also sought to eschew food trends like small plates and molecular gastronomy, instead seeking approachable and high-quality dishes designed to appeal to both casual diners and those seeking a celebratory experience. The restaurant's name, Riviera, is derived from the Buick Riviera, maintaining a naming tradition among other establishments owned by Carmichael and Holley, which are also named after 1970s era automobiles.

When the restaurant first opened, it was envisioned as an all-day establishment, offering breakfast, lunch, and dinner, with a focus on serving pastries and espresso in the mornings to cater to the nearby downtown workforce. As of 2025, however, the restaurant operates exclusively for dinner.

== Recognition ==
The restaurant was ranked #7 in Air Canada's annual list of 10 best new restaurants in Canada in 2017.

Ottawa Citizen restaurant critic Peter Hum called Riviera a "shot in the arm" for downtown Ottawa's Sparks Street area, highlighting the business's spot prawn and scallop chowder, beef short rib, and chocolate peanut butter tart as its best dishes.

Riviera has also received recognition for its cocktail program, created by mixologist and bar manager Stephen Flood. Flood's cocktail list changes with the season, and includes ten variations of the Negroni.

The restaurant, located across the street from the Office of the Prime Minister, gained notoriety for being a popular hangout for former Prime Minister of Canada Justin Trudeau and his family, as well as senior members of government staff and lobbyists.

=== Canada's 100 Best Restaurants Ranking ===
Riviera has been a consistent presence on Canada's 100 Best Restaurants list since its debut at 2017, peaking at #26 in 2020. In the 2024 edition, it was ranked #28 nationwide, and was the highest ranked restaurant on that list in Ottawa that year. It last appeared on the 2025 list, where the restaurant ranked #88.

Riviera
| Year | Rank | Change |
| 2017 | 73 | new |
| 2018 | 54 | ▲19 |
| 2019 | 51 | ▲3 |
| 2020 | 26 | ▲25 |
| 2021 | No List | |
| 2022 | 43 | ▼17 |
| 2023 | 49 | ▼6 |
| 2024 | 28 | ▲21 |
| 2025 | 88 | ▼60 |
| 2026 | ▼ No Rank | |

== Controversies ==
In 2017, media reported that co-owner Carmichael admitted to sexual harassment and drug abuse, which included allegations from a former employee of Riviera.

Following the accusations, the restaurant stated it had removed Carmichael from his managerial position. Carmichael released a statement following the allegations stating that he had handed over operations of the business to the restaurant's management team, and no longer had a role in daily operations. Others in Ottawa's food and entertainment scene alleged that Carmichael's behaviour had been an "open secret" in the sector.
