= Alobar Yorkville =

Restaurant in Toronto, Ontario, Canada

- Interactive map of Alobar Yorkville

Restaurant information
- Established: 2018; 8 years ago
- Owner: Patrick Kriss
- Head chef: Patrick Kriss
- Chef: John Buan
- Food type: French
- Rating: (Michelin Guide, 2022–2023)
- Location: 57A-162 Cumberland Street, Toronto, Ontario, Canada
- Coordinates: 43°40′12″N 79°23′37″W
- Website: thealobar.com/alobar-yorkville/

Alobar Yorkville is a French restaurant in Toronto, Ontario, Canada. The restaurant serves seafood and had formerly received a Michelin star. The restaurant lost its star in 2024, becoming, alongside Yukashi, the first restaurants in Canada to lose this designation while still remaining in operation.

== Recognition ==
=== Canada's 100 Best Restaurants Ranking ===
Alobar Yorkville
Year	Rank	Change
2019	65	new
2020	29	▲36
2021	No List	
2022	92	▼63
2023	▼ No Rank	
2024	▼ No Rank	
2025	▼ No Rank	
2026	▼ No Rank	

== See also ==
- List of French restaurants
- List of Michelin-starred restaurants in Toronto
