= Yukashi =

Restaurant in Toronto, Ontario, Canada

- Interactive map of Yukashi

Restaurant information
- Established: 2018
- Closed: May 2, 2026
- Food type: Japanese
- Rating: (Michelin Guide, 2022–2023)
- Location: 643A Mount Pleasant Road, Toronto, M4S 2M9, Canada
- Coordinates: 43°42′17.9″N 79°23′19″W
- Website: yukashitoronto.com

Yukashi was a Japanese restaurant in Toronto, Ontario, Canada. The restaurant closed in May 2026.

== Recognition ==
The restaurant had received a Michelin star in Toronto's 2022 and 2023 Michelin Guides. The restaurant lost its star in 2024, becoming, alongside Alobar Yorkville, the first restaurants in Canada to lose this designation while still remaining in operation.

== See also ==
- List of Japanese restaurants
- List of Michelin-starred restaurants in Toronto
