= Sushi Masaki Saito =

Japanese restaurant in Toronto, Ontario, Canada

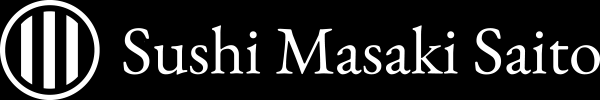

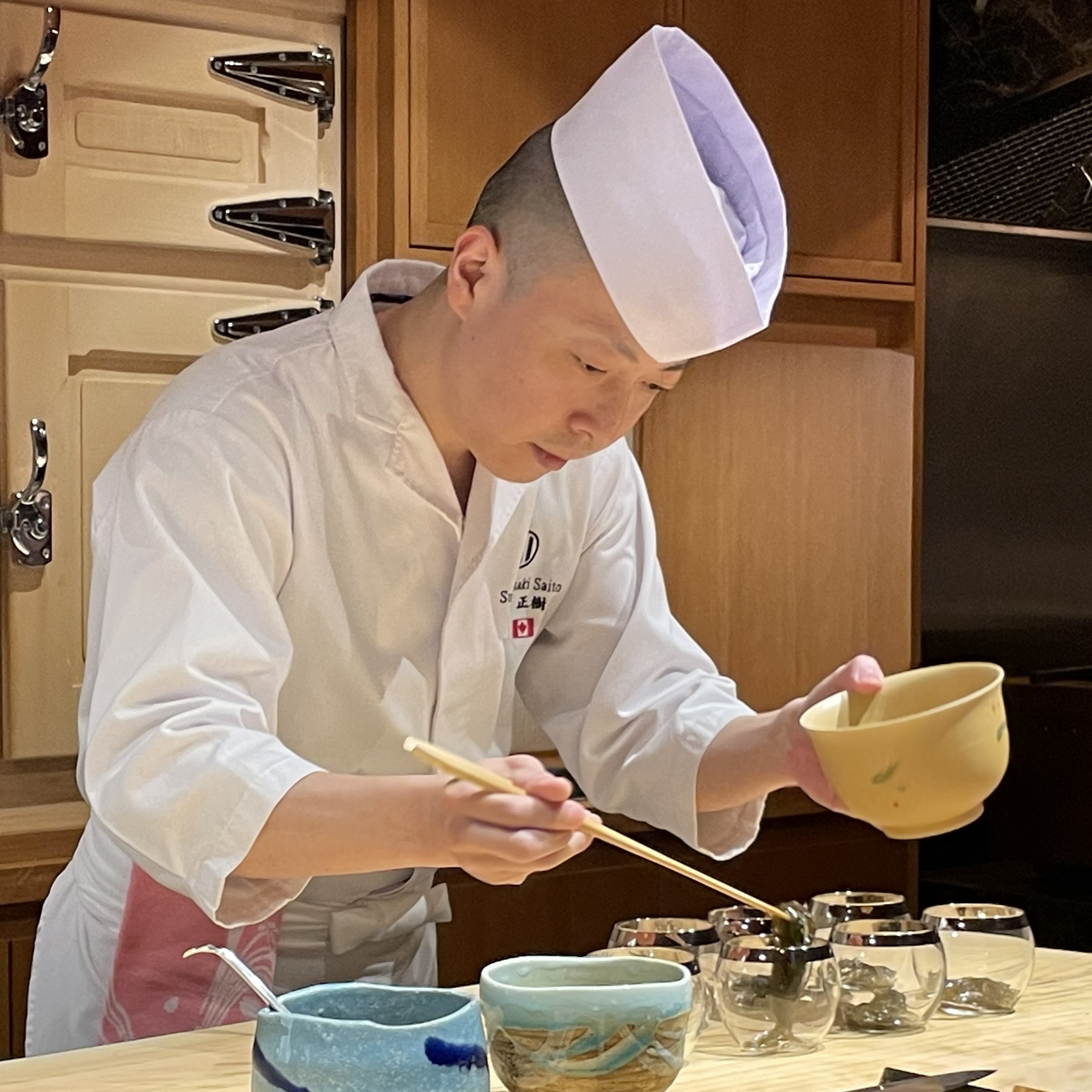
- Chef Masaki Saito preparing a course.
- Interactive map of Sushi Masaki Saito

Restaurant information
- Established: May 18, 2019
- Owners: William Cheng; Masaki Saito
- Head chef: Masaki Saito
- Food type: Japanese
- Rating: (Michelin Guide)
- Location: 88 Avenue Road, Toronto, M5R 2H2, Canada
- Coordinates: 43°40′20.2″N 79°23′44.9″W
- Seating capacity: 6
- Website: www.masakisaito.ca

Sushi Masaki Saito is a Japanese restaurant run by chef Masaki Saito. It has one Michelin star.

== History ==
The restaurant was opened in 2019 by Toronto-based multi-millionaire William Cheng, who was seeking to open a high-end sushi restaurant to compliment his other restaurant, Shoushin. Cheng had initially planned to open the restaurant with another sushi chef heading the kitchen, but offered the role and co-ownership of the business to Masaki Saito following discussion with the chef. At the time, Saito was the head chef of New York City's Sushi Ginza Onodera, which had earned a Michelin star in 2017, and two stars in 2018.

== Concept ==
The restaurant serves an Edomae-style sushi omakase that changes seasonally, with a focus on preservation and aging techniques to enhance the flavours of the seafood served. It accommodates six guests per seating, with two seatings offered each evening. All guests are seated at a sushi counter facing the chef, with the counter made of Japanese cedar and cypress.

According to Saito, about 95% of the ingredients used at his restaurant are sourced from Japan, with much of it flown in daily from the country.

While the restaurant does not restrict photography, Saito has stated his wish for patrons visiting his restaurant to focus less on their phones and instead on eating his sushi when served fresh at the ideal temperature.

== Recognition ==
On September 13, 2022, the first ever Michelin Guide Toronto was announced. Sushi Masaki Saito was the only restaurant given two stars. The restaurant retained its two star rating in the guide in 2023 and 2024, and was the only two Michelin-starred restaurant in Canada until being joined by Quebec City's Tanière³ in May 2025.

in September 2025, the restaurant was downgraded to one star in that year's edition of the Michelin Guide.

=== Canada's 100 Best Restaurants Ranking ===
Sushi Masaki Saito has consistently placed on Canada's 100 Best Restaurants list since its debut in 2020. As of 2026, it ranks #52 in the country.

Sushi Masaki Saito
| Year | Rank | Change |
| 2020 | 10 | new |
| 2021 | No List | |
| 2022 | 11 | ▼1 |
| 2023 | 19 | ▼8 |
| 2024 | 30 | ▼11 |
| 2025 | 16 | ▲14 |
| 2026 | 52 | ▼36 |

== Gallery ==
Chef Saito and his assistant preparing a course.

== See also ==
- List of Japanese restaurants
- List of Michelin-starred restaurants in Toronto
