= Shawarma Palace =

Shawarma chain in Ottawa, Ontario, Canada

Restaurant information
- Established: 1996
- Owner: Hanadi Dawi
- Food type: Lebanese
- Location: 464 Rideau St., Ottawa, Ontario, Canada
- Other locations: 10
- Website: shawarmapalace.ca

Shawarma Palace is a small chain of Lebanese-style shawarma restaurants located in Ottawa, Ontario.

== History ==
The restaurant opened its original location in 1996. It quickly became established as one of the more notable shawarma restaurants in Ottawa, a city where the dish has become an unexpectedly dominant fast-food staple. Ottawa is home to one of the highest concentrations of shawarma shops in North America, with more locations than major fast-food burger chains combined. The city's shawarma boom traces back to the 1980s, when Lebanese immigrants popularized the late-night shawarma scene among the city's bar crowd, cementing its status as Ottawa’s quintessential street food. The flagship location of Shawarma Palace on Rideau Street operates until 2 a.m. on weekends and is within walking distance of the ByWard Market, a neighbourhood renowned for its vibrant nightlife and bar scene.

The business has expanded to multiple locations over its years of operation. In 2017, there were 3 locations in Ottawa. As of March 2025, there are 9 locations in the city and its suburbs. It is also a sponsor and concession stand partner with the Ottawa RedBlacks and Ottawa Senators, serving food at games for both teams.

In February 2024, Shawarma Palace filed a lawsuit at the Federal Court of Canada against Gatineau-based Le Palais du Shawarma, alleging trademark infringement. The lawsuit claims that the defendant’s use of a similar name created confusion and devalued Shawarma Palace’s brand. As of March 2025, Shawarma Palace does not operate any locations in Gatineau. In response, Le Palais du Shawarma stated it would change its name.

== Recognition ==
The Ottawa Citizen highlighted Shawarma Palace as being "consistently ranked among Ottawa’s favourites." The paper’s restaurant critic, Peter Hum, praised the restaurant’s shawarma platter for both its quantity and quality, describing it as a "truly daunting amount of food" with portions weighing up to two-and-a-half pounds. He noted that while the meat varied in moisture, it ultimately served as "a delivery system for garlic sauce."

Writing for The Boston Globe, journalist Fluto Shinzawa praised Shawarma Palace as “the definition of one-meal dining,” highlighting its generous portions and exceptional value. He lauded the chicken shawarma for its crispy exterior and tender interior, describing it as a “bargain” and noting that even a cold falafel sandwich hours later remained a satisfying meal.

Eater listed Shawarma Palace among its "24 Best Restaurants in Ottawa," recommending "if you eat one thing in Ottawa, make it a shawarma plate from this legendary Lebanese spot on Rideau."

In 2025, Shawarma Palace placed first in a blind taste test competition at Ottawa's first annual Shawarma Festival.
