= Kaiseki Yu-zen Hashimoto =

Japanese restaurant in Toronto, Canada

- Interactive map of Kaiseki Yu-zen Hashimoto

Restaurant information
- Established: 2001
- Owner: Masaki Hashimoto
- Head chef: Masaki Hashimoto
- Food type: Japanese
- Rating: (Michelin Guide)
- Location: 6 Garamond Court, Toronto, M3C 1Z5, Canada
- Coordinates: 43°43′35″N 79°20′6″W
- Seating capacity: 6
- Website: www.kaiseki.ca

Kaiseki Yu-zen Hashimoto is a Japanese restaurant in Toronto, Ontario, Canada. The restaurant has received a Michelin star.

== History ==
The restaurant originally opened in 2001 in a Mississauga strip mall, before re-locating in 2009 to its present location at the Japanese Canadian Cultural Centre in Toronto's North York borough.

It is owned and operated by Masaki Hashimoto, a chef from Japan who was previously ranked one of the best in the country. Hashimoto's wife and son also staff the restaurant, with the latter being a certified sake sommelier (Kikisake-shi) who runs the restaurant's beverage program and sake pairings.

== Concept ==
The restaurant offers a Japanese kaiseki-style eight course menu, culminating with a traditional tea ceremony.

It seats three tables per night, with each provided a private seating area.

Every ingredient in the restaurant's food is imported weekly from Japan. It also imports the entirety of its matcha offering from Kyoto.

== Recognition ==
Kaiseki Yu-zen Hashimoto received a Michelin star in Toronto's inaugural Michelin Guide that was revealed in 2022, and has retained its star every year since. Michelin highlighted the restaurant's spotlight on seasonal Japanese ingredients, including sashimi, Miyazaki wagyu, and Shizouka muskmelon.

Toronto Star restaurant critic Amy Pataki reviewed the restaurant in 2010, praising its service for being "as elegant as a ballet" and providing a "memorable cultural experience along with rare and brilliant food."

In 2018, lifestyle magazine Toronto Life ranked Hashimoto among Toronto's best Japanese restaurants, stating that the atmosphere and service "transport you to Kyoto".

The restaurant appeared on Canada's 100 Best Restaurants list in 2015.

=== Canada's 100 Best Restaurants Ranking ===
Kaiseki Yu-zen Hashimoto
Year	Rank	Change
2015	39	new
2016	▼ No Rank	
2017	▼ No Rank	
2018	▼ No Rank	
2019	▼ No Rank	
2020	▼ No Rank	
2021	No List	
2022	▼ No Rank	
2023	▼ No Rank	
2024	▼ No Rank	
2025	▼ No Rank	
2026	▼ No Rank	

== See also ==
- List of Japanese restaurants
- List of Michelin-starred restaurants in Toronto
