= Chenoy's =

Jewish delicatessen and restaurant chain in Canada

Chenoy's was a Jewish delicatessen and restaurant chain that operated in Montreal, Canada. It was originally known for offering the Montreal-style smoked meat sandwich. Chenoy's first opened in the old Jewish neighbourhood on the Main, close to Marie-Anne street, and would later expand to other parts of the island of Montreal. The last surviving Chenoy's deli restaurant in the chain was located in Dollard-des-Ormeaux, which opened in 1974 by Morty Chenoy and brothers Nick and Costa Sigounis. From its opening in 1936 until its bankruptcy and closure in 2026, Chenoy's had a presence in Montreal for over 90 years.

== History ==
Like other great Montreal delis (Schwartz's, Dunn's), Chenoy's first opened in the old Jewish neighbourhood on the Main (Saint Laurent Boulevard), close to Marie-Anne street. As times changed, the deli would move and be franchised. From Chenoy's history:

"...in 1936 we lost the key...

The original (4) "Chenoy Boys" had been doing Deli right since 1936. Our story starts in a small local of St.Laurent Boulevard... now over 75 years later we're still turning out our Famous Smoked-Meat from all areas of the city!

Their specialty was Smoked-Meat, but the new owners haven’t stopped at that!... from bacon & eggs, to filet mignon.... Chenoys is the place to grab a bite for whatever you might like.

The only problem is in 1936 we lost the key... so we’ve been working 25 Hrs a day, 365 days a year ever since to serve you!

The illustration on the cover depicts the original location of Deli Chenoys in 1936, then located on St. Laurent Boulevard, near Marianne Street. From its humble origins to modern times, our success has gone through several decades and generations, but one thing has remained the same...."

Chenoy's would later franchise delis, in Lasalle, Quebec, at 7660 Newman Boulevad; in Brossard, on Taschereau Boulevard; and in Chomedey, in Laval, on Boulevard Curé-Labelle. They have all since closed its doors in 2017. The last family member to be an owner was the late Mortimer (Morty) Chenoy.

A Chenoy's franchise opened in Gatineau in 1997 on Boulevard de l'Hôpital, in Complexe Lumière (aka "Cinema 9"). It was closed in 2019 and rebranded as part of the Nickels deli chain.

== Restaurants ==
The oldest remaining Chenoy's deli was in Dollard-des-Ormeaux, on Saint-Jean Boulevard, which opened in 1974 by Morty Chenoy and brothers Nick and Costa Sigounis. It was closed in August 2026.

The Sigounis family manipulated Morty into selling his family's half of the business in the mid-1980s when he was diagnosed with early onset Alzheimer's disease. His diseased progressed to the point that he had no understanding about the birth of his youngest granddaughter in 1989. Morty died on January 22, 1999.

Despite the Chenoy family exiting the business, the Sigounis family continued to use the term, "Since 1936". This term called back to the Chenoy family's original business on St-Laurent, started by Morty's father with the help of Morty and his three other sons. The original location on The Main is where the moniker "Chenoy Boys" was founded.

In 2015 the West Island restaurant building was put up or sale, but the Sigounis family has stated that it planned to keep the landmark deli in the West Island. That same year the building in Chomedey, on Quebec Route 117, was closed and demolished roughly four years later. In 2020, the West Island restaurant was the only Chenoys that remained in operation.

== See also ==
- List of Ashkenazi Jewish restaurants
- List of delicatessens
