= List of Michelin-starred restaurants in Toronto =

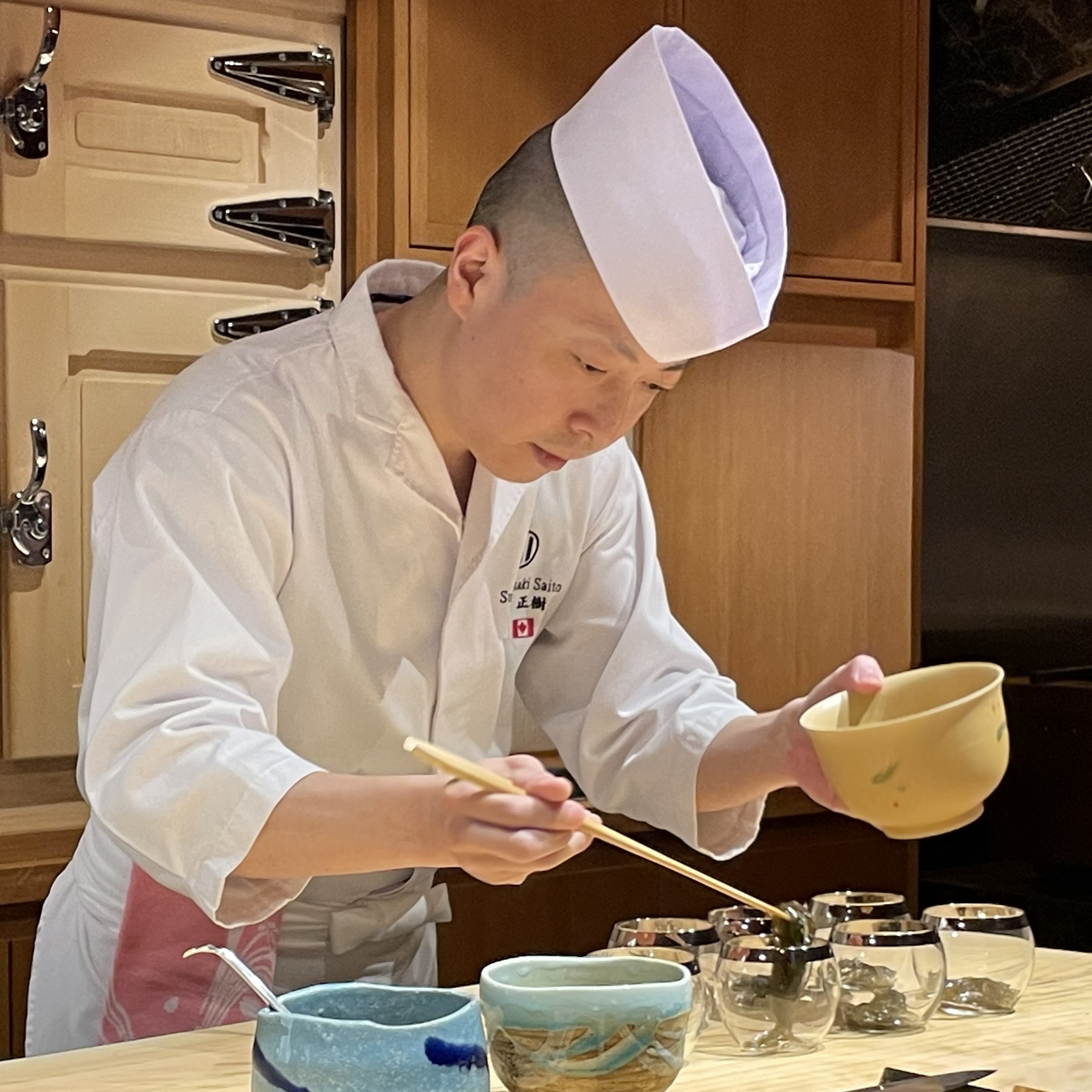
Chef Masaki Saito preparing a course at Sushi Masaki Saito.

As of the 2026 Michelin Guide, there are 15 restaurants in the Greater Toronto Area (GTA) with a Michelin star rating.

The Michelin Guides have been published by the French tire company Michelin since 1900. They were designed as a guide to tell drivers about eateries they recommended to visit and to subtly sponsor their tires, by encouraging drivers to use their cars more and therefore need to replace the tires as they wore out. Over time, the stars that were given out became more valuable.

Multiple anonymous Michelin inspectors visit the restaurants several times. They rate the restaurants on five criteria: "quality of products", "mastery of flavour and cooking techniques", "the personality of the chef represented in the dining experience", "value for money", and "consistency between inspectors' visits". Inspectors have at least ten years of expertise and create a list of popular restaurants supported by media reports, reviews, and diner popularity. If they reach a consensus, Michelin awards restaurants from one to three stars based on its evaluation methodology: one star means "high-quality cooking, worth a stop", two stars signify "excellent cooking, worth a detour", and three stars denote "exceptional cuisine, worth a special journey". The stars are not permanent and restaurants are constantly re-evaluated. If the criteria are not met, the restaurant will lose its stars.

The Toronto Michelin Guide was originally planned to launch in 2020, but it was delayed by the COVID-19 pandemic, and instead launched in September 2022. The guide was initiated through a marketing partnership between Destination Toronto and Michelin, similar to other cities the guide has entered in recent years. In 2024, the geographic coverage was expanded to include the communities and regions that surround Toronto, with the guide officially being renamed by Michelin to "Toronto and Region". The GTA also has 26 restaurants with a Bib Gourmand designation, an award that Michelin gives out for good quality meals at moderate prices.

== Lists ==
Key
1 Michelin star	One Michelin star
2 Michelin stars	Two Michelin stars
—	The restaurant did not receive a star that year
Closed	The restaurant is no longer open

Michelin-starred restaurants
Name	Cuisine	Location	2022	2023	2024	2025	2026
Aburi Hana	Japanese	Toronto – Yorkville	1 Michelin star	1 Michelin star	1 Michelin star	1 Michelin star	—
aKin	Chinese	Toronto – Downtown	—	—	—	1 Michelin star	1 Michelin star
Alo	French	Toronto – Downtown	1 Michelin star	1 Michelin star	1 Michelin star	1 Michelin star	1 Michelin star
Alobar Yorkville	French	Toronto – Yorkville	1 Michelin star	1 Michelin star	—	—	—
DaNico	Italian	Toronto – Downtown	—	—	1 Michelin star	1 Michelin star	1 Michelin star
Don Alfonso 1890	Italian	Toronto – Downtown	1 Michelin star	1 Michelin star	1 Michelin star	1 Michelin star	1 Michelin star
Edulis	Spanish	Toronto – West End	1 Michelin star	1 Michelin star	1 Michelin star	1 Michelin star	1 Michelin star
Enigma Yorkville	Canadian	Toronto – Downtown	1 Michelin star	1 Michelin star	1 Michelin star	1 Michelin star	1 Michelin star
Frilu	Nordic / Japanese	Markham	1 Michelin star	1 Michelin star	Closed		
Hexagon	French	Oakville	—	—	1 Michelin star	1 Michelin star	Closed
Kaiseki Yu-zen Hashimoto	Japanese	Toronto – North York	1 Michelin star	1 Michelin star	1 Michelin star	1 Michelin star	1 Michelin star
Kappo Sato	Japanese	Toronto – Midtown	—	1 Michelin star	1 Michelin star	1 Michelin star	1 Michelin star
Osteria Giulia	Italian	Toronto – Yorkville	1 Michelin star	1 Michelin star	1 Michelin star	1 Michelin star	1 Michelin star
The Pine	Chinese	Clearview	—	—	1 Michelin star	1 Michelin star	1 Michelin star
Quetzal	Mexican	Toronto – Downtown	1 Michelin star	1 Michelin star	1 Michelin star	1 Michelin star	1 Michelin star
Restaurant 20 Victoria	French / Mexican (Note: Until 2025 and under the previous head chef, the restaurant's cuisine was classified as Contemporary and seafood)	Toronto – Downtown	—	1 Michelin star	1 Michelin star	1 Michelin star	1 Michelin star
Restaurant Pearl Morissette	Canadian	Lincoln	—	—	1 Michelin star	2 Michelin stars	2 Michelin stars
Shoushin	Japanese	Toronto – North York	1 Michelin star	1 Michelin star	1 Michelin star	1 Michelin star	1 Michelin star
Sushi Masaki Saito	Japanese	Toronto – Yorkville	2 Michelin stars	2 Michelin stars	2 Michelin stars	1 Michelin star	1 Michelin star
Yukashi	Japanese	Toronto – Midtown	1 Michelin star	1 Michelin star	—	—	Closed
Reference(s)							

== Criticism ==
The launch of the guide has attracted critique from various outlets including BBC News, suggesting that the selected restaurants were not representative of the diversity of Toronto's food scene, and that the city did not need outside recognition. The Toronto Star argued that the inaugural 2022 guide failed to capture the full diversity of Toronto restaurants, being overly represented by Japanese cuisine and downtown restaurants. The Star also publishes its own alternative restaurant guide that it argues better captures Toronto's food scene, released around the same time as the annual Michelin Guide update. This followed Michelin facing criticism for not emphasizing diversity and neglecting broader demographics in the city.

Others criticized the Michelin Guide for overlooking suburban Toronto, particularly Scarborough, which is often regarded as having the city's most diverse food scene. In both 2022 and 2023, only one Scarborough restaurant received recognition, earning a Michelin Bib Gourmand designation. In 2024, Michelin expanded its geographic coverage beyond the core city, including restaurants in suburban areas and extending as far as the Niagara Region, Simcoe County, and the Grey Highlands, areas well outside the Greater Toronto Area.

== See also ==
- List of Michelin-starred restaurants in Quebec
- List of Michelin-starred restaurants in Vancouver
- List of Michelin Bib Gourmand restaurants in Canada
- List of restaurants in Canada
