= The Yeti Cafe =

Cafe and restaurant in Kitchener, Canada

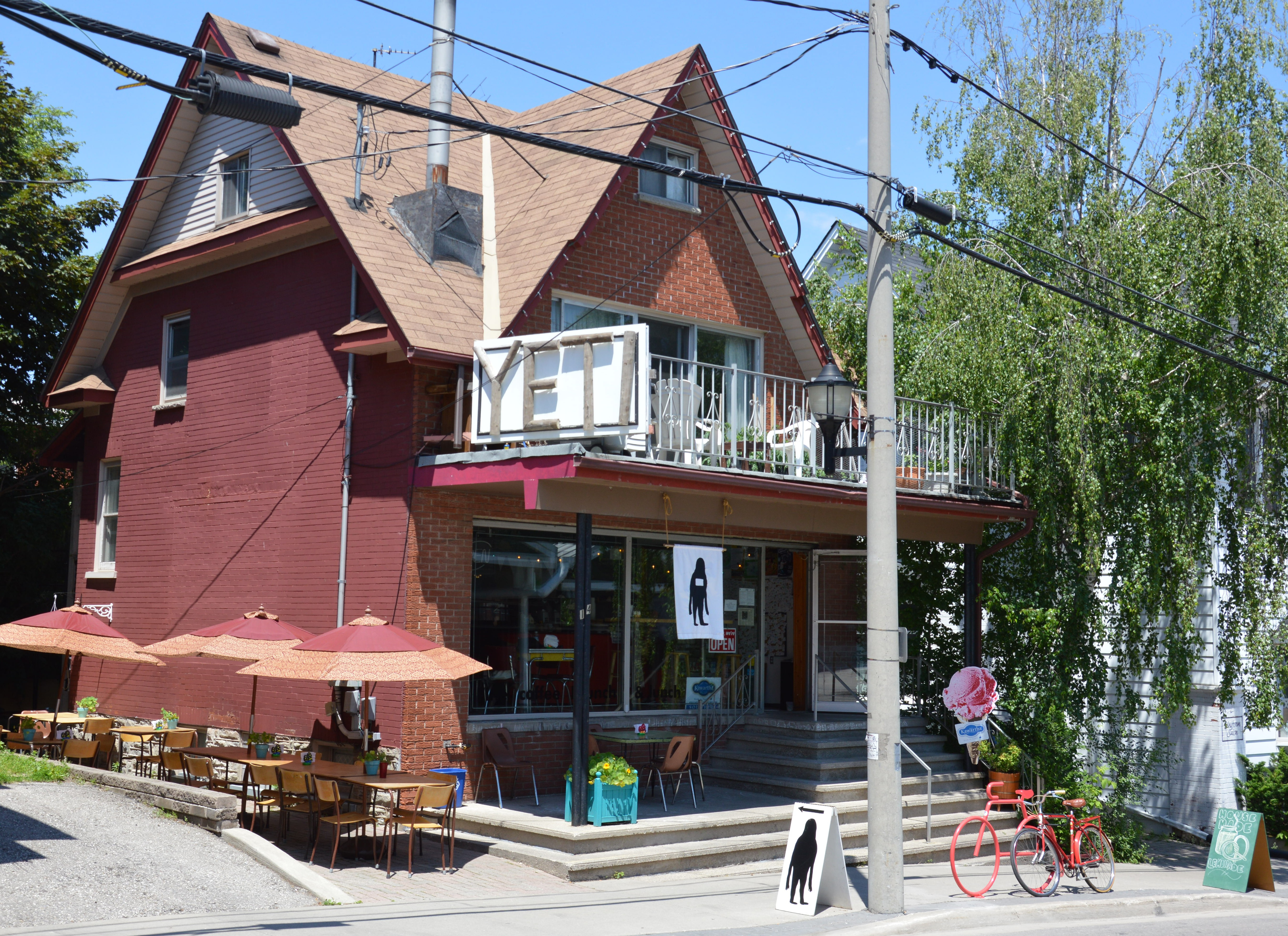
- Interactive map of The Yeti Cafe

Restaurant information
- Established: 2012
- Owner: Victoria Kent
- Location: 14 Eby St. N, Kitchener, Ontario, Canada
- Coordinates: 43.44825°N 80.48429°W
- Website: www.theyeticafe.com

The Yeti Cafe is a cafe, restaurant, and music venue located in Kitchener, Ontario, Canada, at 14 Eby St. N. The cafe is located near the Kitchener Farmer's Market. Victoria Kent opened the Yeti cafe in 2012, located in a repurposed house. The cafe's menu uses unconventional naming of its dishes and features omelets, bagel sandwiches and bread sandwiches. For drinks, coffee, tea, and espresso are served. The Yeti has received praise from reviewers for its atmosphere, food, and coffee.

== History ==
The Yeti Cafe was opened by Victoria Kent in 2012. The building was previously a Grainharvest Breadhouse location. Before moving to Kitchener in 2011, Kent was a librarian. The Yeti was named after one of the cafe's paintings. On July 13, 2012, the cafe had a sidewalk advertisement sign confiscated and disposed of by a city bylaw officer, leading to drops in revenue and local controversy. Kent later received apologies from city officials. In 2015, a quarter of the Yeti's revenue came from catering, especially from local startup businesses. The cafe was renovated in 2021, adding more bathrooms and a heated patio.

== Description ==
The Yeti Cafe is located in downtown Kitchener at 14 Eby St. N., which is near the Kitchener Farmer's Market. The cafe, located in a repurposed house, has a patio and indoor tables for seating. The Toronto Star described the Yeti as an "artsy breakfast spot" in 2022. Chef Jonathan Gushue described the Yeti's food as "non-gimmicky comfort food".

The cafe's menu uses "eclectic" names and features omelets, bagel sandwiches and bread sandwiches. Most dishes can be given substitutions to be made vegan or vegetarian. Coffee, tea, and espresso are served. Their coffee is supplied by Cultura Café and originates from Nicaragua. Local bakeries Golden Hearth and Grainharvest supply the cafe's breads. Since 2022, the cafe has begun to roast their beans.

== Reception ==
A 2013 Record review praised the Yeti's breakfast sandwiches, coffee, and options for dietary restrictions. Alex Bielak of The Record recommended the Yeti in 2020, enjoying its relaxed atmosphere and its integration in the city's urban fabric. Jessica Huras of the Toronto Star recommended the cafe in 2022 in a daytrip guide to Waterloo Region. An illustration of the Yeti was included in the 2023 art book, The Art of Nostalgia by Trevor Clare, which depicts the Region's "landmarks and hidden gems". Matt Johnson, director of the 2023 film BlackBerry, is a "big fan" of the Yeti.
