= Osteria Giulia =

Restaurant in Toronto, Ontario, Canada

- Interactive map of Osteria Giulia

Restaurant information
- Established: October 1, 2021
- Owners: David Minicucci; Rob Rossi
- Manager: Marco Thompson
- Head chef: Rob Rossi
- Food type: Italian
- Rating: (Michelin Guide)
- Location: 134 Avenue Road, Toronto, Ontario, Canada
- Coordinates: 43°40′27.6″N 79°23′47.8″W
- Seating capacity: 66
- Website: osteriagiulia.ca

Osteria Giulia is an Italian restaurant in Toronto, Ontario, Canada.

The restaurant's cuisine takes inspiration from Italy's Northern coast, and is focused on pasta and seafood. It is headed by Chef Rob Rossi, the former runner-up on Season 1 of the reality competition show Top Chef Canada.

Osteria Giulia also has a more casual sister-restaurant located in Toronto's West End, Giulietta, which also received a Michelin Guide recognition.

== Recognition ==
The restaurant received a Michelin star in Toronto's inaugural Michelin Guide in 2022, retaining the star in 2023, 2024, and 2025. The restaurant's sommelier and general manager, Marco Thompson, was also recognized as the Toronto Michelin Guide's Sommelier Award Winner during the 2023 ceremony.

The restaurant was ranked number 17 in Canada's 100 Best Restaurants list in 2024. It has also made La Liste's World's Best Restaurant list in 2024.

=== Canada's 100 Best Restaurants Ranking ===
Osteria Giulia
Year	Rank	Change
2022	14	new
2023	14	Steady
2024	17	▼3
2025	72	▼55
2026	▼ No Rank	

== See also ==
- List of Italian restaurants
- List of Michelin-starred restaurants in Toronto
