= Veslo Family Restaurant =

Serbian restaurant in Kitchener, Canada

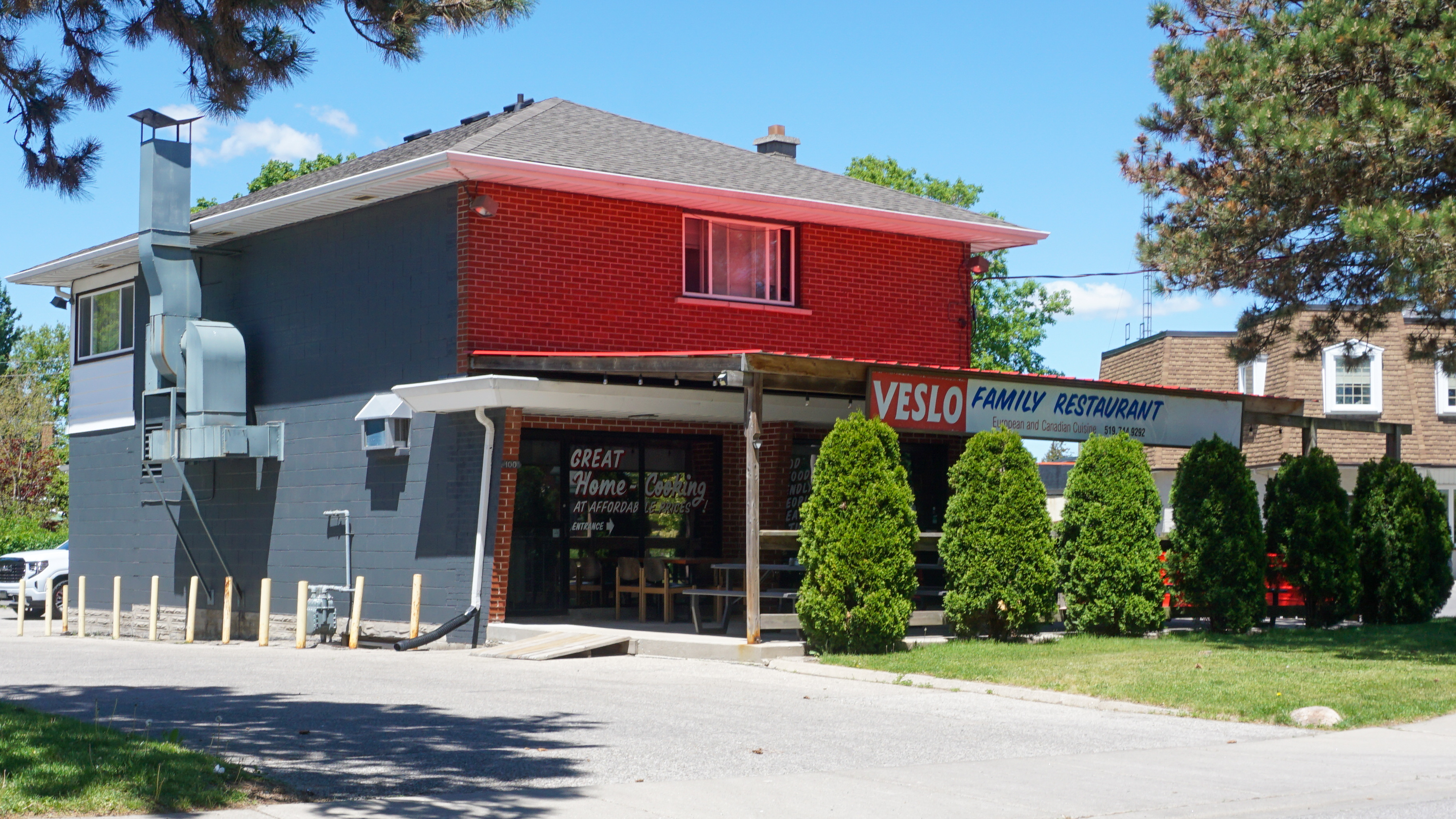
- Interactive map of Veslo Family Restaurant

Restaurant information
- Established: 2007
- Owner: Culum family
- Food type: Serbian
- Location: 100 Arnold St., Kitchener, Ontario, Canada
- Coordinates: 43.467812°N 80.484988°W
- Seating capacity: 40
- Other locations: Grand Bent, Ont. (8788 Lakeshore Rd)
- Website: www.veslofamilyrestaurant.com

Veslo Family Restaurant is an eastern European restaurant in Kitchener, Ontario, Canada, located at 100 Arnold St.

== History ==
Bob and Vesna Culum moved from Yugoslavia to Canada in 1997; they later opened a specialty grocery store in Guelph, Ontario. Bob and Vesna opened Veslo in 2007. In 2015, they opened a second location in Grand Bend, Ontario, which included a motel, bar, and restaurant. Their children, Miki and Alex Culum, co-own the Kitchener restaurant as of 2019.

== Overview and menu ==
Veslo Family Restaurant is located on 100 Arnold St. in Kitchener, Ontario, "hiding on the edge of a residential neighbourhood". Its two dining rooms seat 40 people. The restaurant, a converted house, has a red brick exterior and is described as a place "you don't notice as you drive by". The interior uses wood furniture and has a European feel, according to a 2017 Record article.

The restaurant specializes in Serbian cuisine. The 2017 Record article described the menu as "hearty, sometimes smoky, and often [featuring] substantial portions of meat". Options for appetizers include Serbian salad and goulash. Some main dishes served include schnitzels, sausage, minced steak, and chevapi. According to a 2018 Record article, the Karadjordjeva Schnitzel is a customer favourite. Dessert options include baklava and krempita.

== Reception ==
Veslo Family Restaurant was reviewed by The Record in 2008, 2014, and 2017. In 2008, Drew Edwards, praised the food and atmosphere, writing "eating at Veslo is like eating in [the owners] home kitchen". Edwards rated the restaurant 3.5 on The Record's 4-point scale. Sylvia Pond's 2014 review praised the large portions, service, atmosphere, and food. In Jasmine Mangalaseril's 2017 review, they praised the food, but disliked the service and timings. They rated the restaurant 1.5 out of 4 (between "fair" and "good").
