= Bhima's Warung =

Asian fusion restaurant in Waterloo, Canada

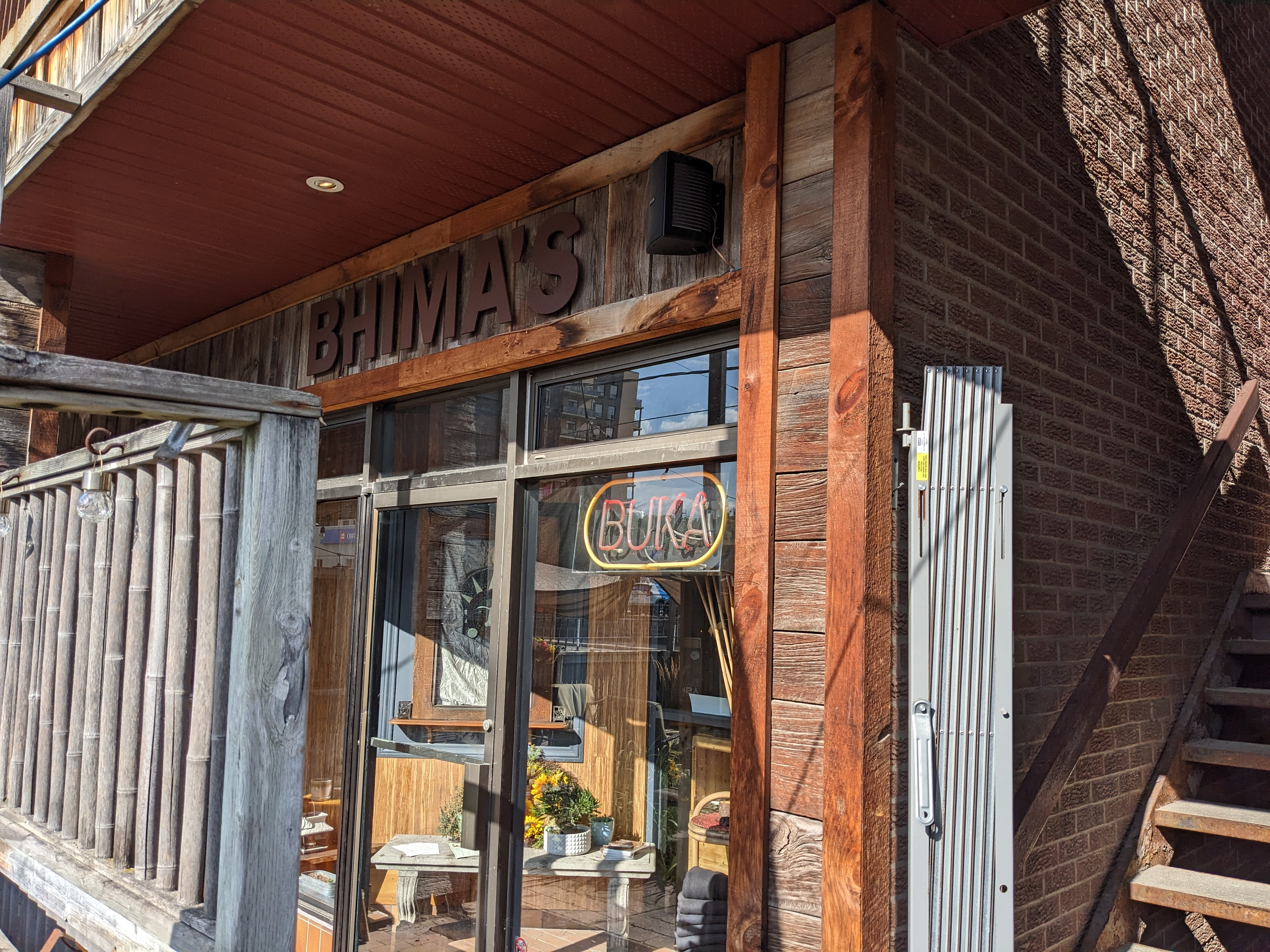
- The storefront of Bhima's Warung
- Interactive map of Bhima's Warung

Restaurant information
- Established: 1994
- Owner: Paul Boehmer
- Food type: Southeast Asian fusion, Indonesian
- Location: 262 King St N., Waterloo, Ontario, Canada
- Coordinates: 43.47744°N 80.52496°W
- Reservations: Yes
- Website: www.bhimaswarung.com

Bhima's Warung is a southeast Asian fusion restaurant in Waterloo, Ontario, Canada, located at 262 King St N.

== Menu ==
According to a 2011 Guelph Mercury article, "Bhima’s menu is all about elaborate, wacky, creative fusion". Bhima's uses elements of French cuisine as a foundation for its fusion of Asian cuisines. Bhima's offers a large selection of fish and seafood, and the food is generally spicy. For drinks, beers, Singha, cocktails, and wines are served. Examples of appetizers served include Goi Tai and Nam Prik Gung Mamauang. For mains, past options have included Cornish hen, Kee Mao, Bistik Tandoori, and the Pad Ped Surf & Turf.

== History ==
Bhima's Warung opened in 1994. The restaurant is owned by Paul Boehmer, and is named after Bhima, a Hindu legend that is a chef to the gods. The warung in the name means a small Indonesian food stall. The restaurant's location has been described as "blink-and-you'll-miss-it".

Boehmer is classically trained in French cuisine (with over 15 years of experience) and discovered southeast Asian cuisines during his travels. While in Indonesia, Boehmer learned some Indonesian, allowing him to learn recipes from elders for traditional dishes. On the mix of cuisines, Boehmer stated "The two came together and it was not necessarily planned." At this time, Asian food was less popular in Waterloo, but this changed as the increase of international students caused the city to become more multicultural.

In 2004, Bhima's added a patio in reaction to a regional no-smoking bylaw. The same year, Boehmer opened Loloan, a restaurant in Bali, Indonesia. In March 2018, Bhima's opened a sister restaurant, Loloan Lobby Bar, which imitates the atmosphere of a hotel lobby bar. Bhima's closed for indoor dining during COVID-19 lockdowns in 2021, but remained open for takeout. Due to the lockdowns, Boehmer considered closing the restaurant, but decided against it.

== Reception ==
Bhima's has received reviews from The Record in 1995, 1998, 2002, 2014, 2017, and 2021, and reviews from the Guelph Mercury in 2000, 2008, and 2011. The 1995 Record review described the food as "sensational" and menu as "exceptional ". The 1998 Record review praised the atmosphere, food, and service. In 2005, Bhima's was listed in the restaurant guide Where to Eat in Canada. The 2011 Mercury review was positive, describing the restaurant as "one of a kind" and summarizing it as having "intoxicating flavours, laid-back atmosphere, great service". According to a 2014 Waterloo Chronicle article by Bob Vrbanac, Bhima's "has been rated as one of the top places to dine in Canada" and is among the highest rated restaurants in the region on Trip Advisor.

=== Legacy ===
According to Andrew Coppolino of CBC News, Bhima's has a reputation for developing cooks who "stay in the region to add their skill to the food scene's diversity". Vrbanac wrote that Bhima's was creating Asian fusion dishes before that trend existed, and "some might suggest that [Boehmer] anticipated the trend".
