= House of Targ =

Music and food venue in Ottawa, Canada

Coordinates: 45.39456°N 75.6834°W

House of Targ is a live music venue, arcade and pierogi restaurant in Ottawa, Canada. The venue opened April 17, 2014, with a live performance from Toronto band PUP.

Most of the bands booked belong to the rock, indie, alternative, punk, hardcore, metal, ska, synth categories. Some bands and artists that have performed at House of TARG include Pup, The Nils, Rational Youth, The Real McKenzies, UK Subs, Neil Hamburger, Angry Samoans, Agathocles, Extreme Noise Terror, Dead Brain Cells, David Liebe Hart, B.A. Johnston, Rich Aucoin, Chixdiggit, Anciients, Hibria, Dayglo Abortions, Screaming Females, The Courtneys, C. J. Ramone, Ian Blurton, Truckfighters, Bob Log III, Re-Animator, Gorod, Mike Krol, Weaves, Hard Skin, Antidote, Blanks 77, A Wilhelm Scream, Days N' Daze, Moon King, Surfer Blood, Pop. 1280, Downtown Boys, Duotang, The Interrupters, Dave Hause, Dilly Dally, White Lung, Diemonds, Dirty Dishes, The Balconies, DZ Deathrays, Dune Rats, The Pack A.D., The Dirty Nil, The Cave Singers, Said The Whale, Library Voices, No Joy, The Elwins, and The Zolas.

The concept behind the House of Targ name comes from the popular 1980 arcade game "Targ".

A monthly House of Targ zine was distributed around Ottawa.

In 2014, the venue had around twelve classic arcade games and eighteen "vintage pinball games".
