= Edulis (restaurant) =

Restaurant in Toronto, Ontario, Canada

- Interactive map of Edulis

Restaurant information
- Established: 2012
- Owners: Michael Caballo; Tobey Nemeth
- Head chef: Michael Caballo; Tobey Nemeth
- Food type: Mediterranean; Spanish
- Rating: (Michelin Guide)
- Location: 169 Niagara Street, Toronto, M5V 1C9, Canada
- Coordinates: 43°38′31″N 79°24′23.7″W
- Website: www.edulisrestaurant.com

Edulis is a restaurant in Toronto, Ontario, Canada. The restaurant serves European and Mediterranean cuisine.

== History ==
The restaurant was opened in 2012 by husband-and-wife chef-owners Michael Caballo and Tobey Nemeth. The couple previously worked at other restaurants in Toronto and globally, before purchasing the Niagara Street Cafe which became Edulis.

== Concept ==
The restaurant serves a tasting menu that focuses on Mediterranean, primarily Spanish, cooking techniques.

Caballo and Nemeth comprise the entirety of the kitchen team, with a small staff of servers.

The restaurant was a no-tipping establishment from August 2021 to December 2023, but has since-then introduced a mandatory service charge. Unlike most restaurants which serve a tasting menu, dessert is offered as a supplement at an additional cost.

== Recognition ==
Edulis received a Michelin star in Toronto's inaugural Michelin Guide that was revealed in 2022, and has retained its star in every year since. The guide praised the dedication of the restaurant's chef-owners and staff, as well as the restaurant's take on Mediterranean cuisine. The restaurant also won the Toronto Michelin Guide's Service Award in 2022.

American food magazine Bon Appétit called Edulis an "intimate celebration of the finer things", highlighting the hyper-seasonal and frequently changing menu and "unblemished" hospitality.

Edulis ranked #25 on North America's 50 Best Restaurants list in 2026.

=== Canada's 100 Best Restaurants Ranking ===
The restaurant has been a consistent presence on Canada's 100 Best Restaurants list since its debut in 2015. As of 2026, it is ranked #5.

Edulis
Year	Rank	Change
2015	7	new
2016	8	▼1
2017	5	▲3
2018	9	▼4
2019	10	▼1
2020	9	▲1
2021	No List	
2022	7	▲2
2023	4	▲3
2024	2	▲2
2025	4	▼2
2026	5	▼1

== See also ==
- List of Michelin-starred restaurants in Toronto
