= Bao Sandwich Bar =

Bao restaurant in Waterloo and Mississauga, Ontario

Restaurant information
- Food type: Bánh mì and gua bao
- Location: 62 Balsam St, Unit B106, Waterloo; 4310 Sherwoodtowne Boulevard Unit #5, Mississauga, Waterloo; Mississauga, Ontario, Canada
- Website: www.baosandwichbar.com

Bao Sandwich Bar is a bao restaurant in Waterloo and Mississauga, Ontario, Canada. The restaurant serves Vietnamese bánh mì sandwiches and Taiwanese gua bao. The menu items take inspiration from a variety of Asian cuisines.

== Menu ==
Bao Sandwich Bar serves sandwiches that include chicken, beef, pork, duck, fish, avocado, and tofu. The sandwiches are either served on steamed bao buns, which are made in-house, or on a baguette. For drinks: coffee, tea, juice, soda, beer, and soju are served.

In a 2017 visit to the Waterloo location, Jasmine Mangalaseril of the Waterloo Region Record tried pork, chicken, and beef-based baos, which were described: "Cottony house-made bao. Crunchy lightly pickled vegetables. Well-prepared and flavourful meats." They also tried desserts: an ice cream sandwich and a "Corn Cookie", which the reviewer found to be "a bit meh". In 2016, Andrew Coppolino of CBC News included the Pork Belly Banh Mi on a list of his 16 favourite dishes of 2016 in the Region, and recommended the dish on a list of sandwich options in the Waterloo Region in 2019.

== Locations ==
=== Waterloo location ===
The address of the Waterloo, Ontario location is 62 Balsam St, Unit B106. The restaurant is located near Wilfrid Laurier University, and according to the Waterloo Region Record, caters to "the university student crowd". The restaurant is located under a student residence, which Andrew Coppolino described as "virtually undiscoverable and nearly subterranean". The location is small, and so not all customers eat in the restaurant.

=== Mississauga location ===
Following the closure of the Mississauga cafe Cold Pressery in December 2020, Bao Sandwich Bar was announced to replace the retail space. Some interior design elements from the Cold Pressery were retained in the Bao Sandwich Bar location. The location opened in November 2021, and its address is 4310 Sherwoodtowne Boulevard Unit #5, near Square One Shopping Centre. The Mississauga location was created after the Waterloo location.

=== Coordinates ===
Address	City	Coordinates
62 Balsam St, Unit B106	Waterloo, Ontario	43.4765°N 80.5300°W
4310 Sherwoodtowne Boulevard, Unit #5	Mississauga, Ontario	43.5995°N 79.6413°W
