= Newport Restaurant =

Restaurant in Ottawa, Ontario, Canada

Coordinates: 45.3946°N 75.7556°W

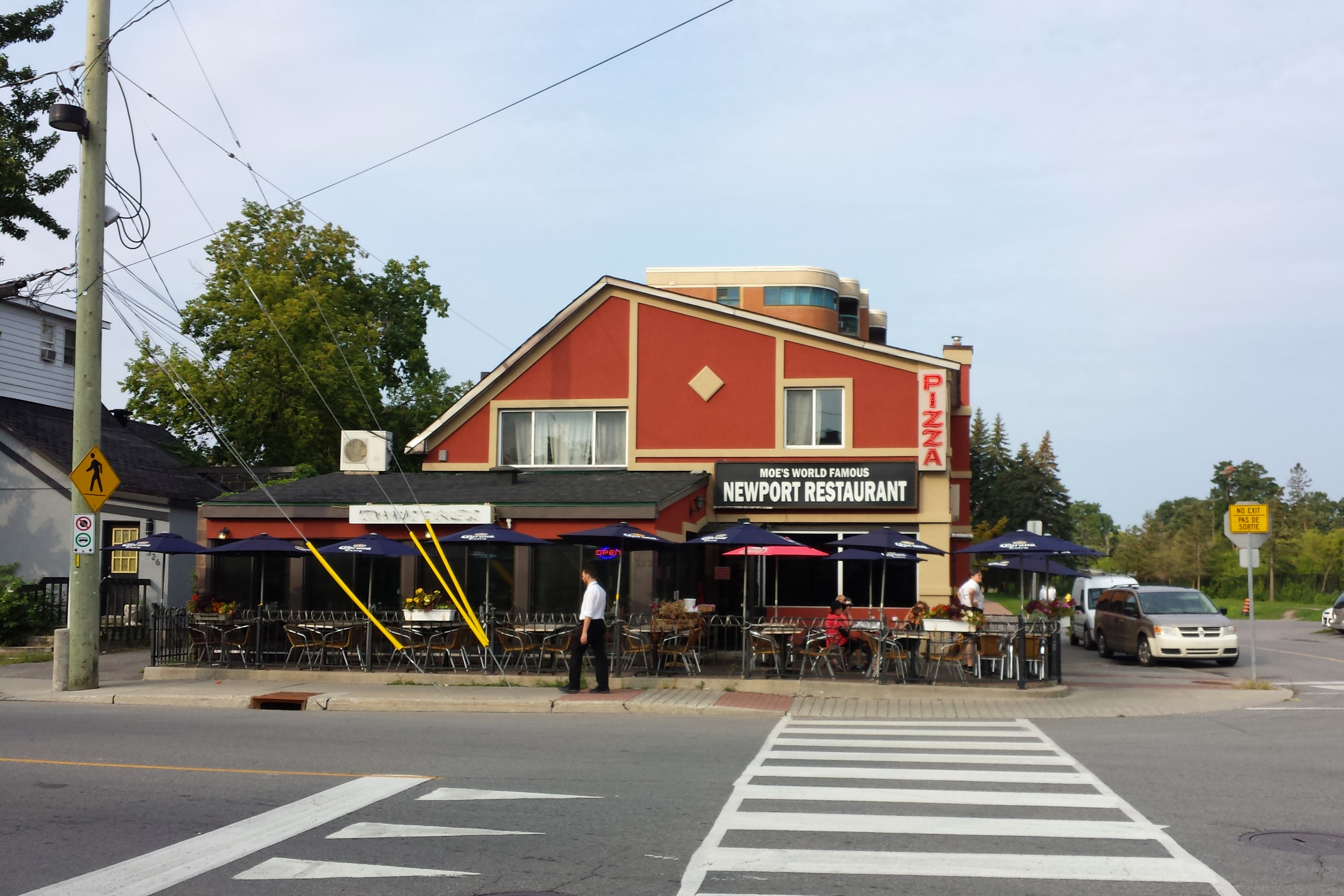
Newport Restaurant on Churchill Avenue

Moe's Newport Restaurant is a Lebanese restaurant and pizzeria located at the intersection of Churchill and Scott in the Westboro neighbourhood of Ottawa, Ontario, Canada. It had previously been located at Richmond and Churchill in Westboro. Moe's also operates a kiosk and patio at Westboro Beach.

== History ==
Moe's was founded by Moe Atallah, a Lebanese restaurateur who was forced to leave his family's restaurant and flee Lebanon in 1976 following the outbreak of the Lebanese Civil War. He worked at various restaurants, including a Greek restaurant on Rideau Street and the Colonnade Pizzeria on Metcalfe Street, before purchasing the Newport Restaurant, then a diner, in 1988. Atallah now owns several other restaurants in the National Capital Region.

Heather Crowe, a Canadian anti-smoking activist, was diagnosed with lung cancer after being exposed to secondhand smoke while working as a waitress at Moe's and other restaurants (at the time smoking was mostly permitted indoors). Crowe began her activism after one Moe's patron, a Health Canada director, helped her campaign against secondhand smoke. Atallah also appeared in public service announcements directed to restaurant owners warning about the dangers of secondhand smoke. Smoking has been banned at Moe's since Crowe's diagnosis.

== Community involvement ==
Moe's is known for holding fundraisers for local charities, as well as its Christmas celebrations, during which the restaurant offers free breakfast, lunch, and donated gifts to those in need.

Attalah and Earl McRae founded the Elvis Sighting Society, a philanthropic organization that often holds events at Moe's; the restaurant is also decorated with Elvis Presley memorabilia. The small lane behind the original restaurant at Richmond and Churchill has since been officially dubbed "Elvis Lives Lane" by Ottawa City Council.

== See also ==
- List of Lebanese restaurants
