= L'Atelier (painting) =

Painting by Horace Vernet

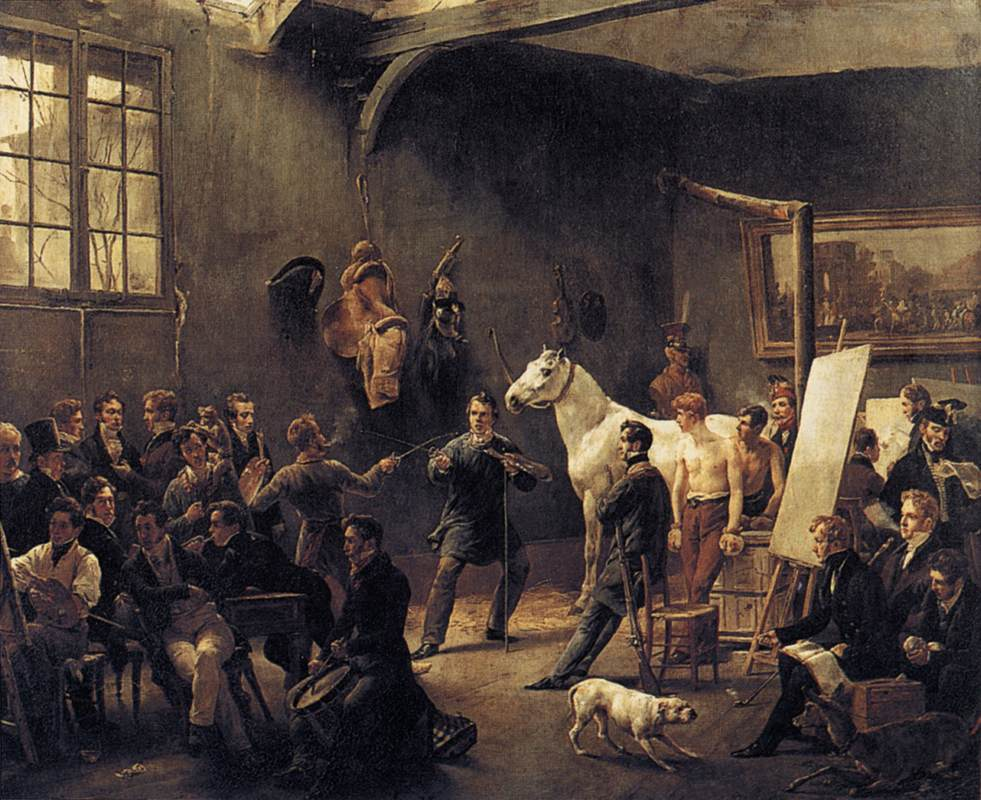
- Artist: Horace Vernet
- Year: 1820–21
- Type: Oil on canvas
- Dimensions: 52 cm × 64 cm (20 in × 25 in)
- Location: Private collection

L'Atelier (English: The Studio) is an 1821 painting by the French artist Horace Vernet. It depicts the interior of his Studio located on the Rue des Martyrs in Paris. It depicts Vernet in his studio with art students. The artist is shown fencing in the middle of the canvas, with an épée in one hand and a Palette in the other. To emphasise his lineage as a painter Vernet included a bust of his grandfather Joseph and a painting of his father Carle's painting The Triumph of Aemilius Paullus.

It was one of the works that Vernet exhibited at his 1822 private view which took place in the depicted studios after two of his submissions to the Salon of 1822 had been rejected by the authorities.

== Bibliography ==
- Alsdorf, Bridget Abigail. The Art of Association: Fantin-Latour and the Modern Group Portrait. University of California, Berkeley, 2008.
- Harkett, Daniel & Hornstein, Katie (ed.) Horace Vernet and the Thresholds of Nineteenth-Century Visual Culture. Dartmouth College Press, 2017.
