= Surly Bob's =

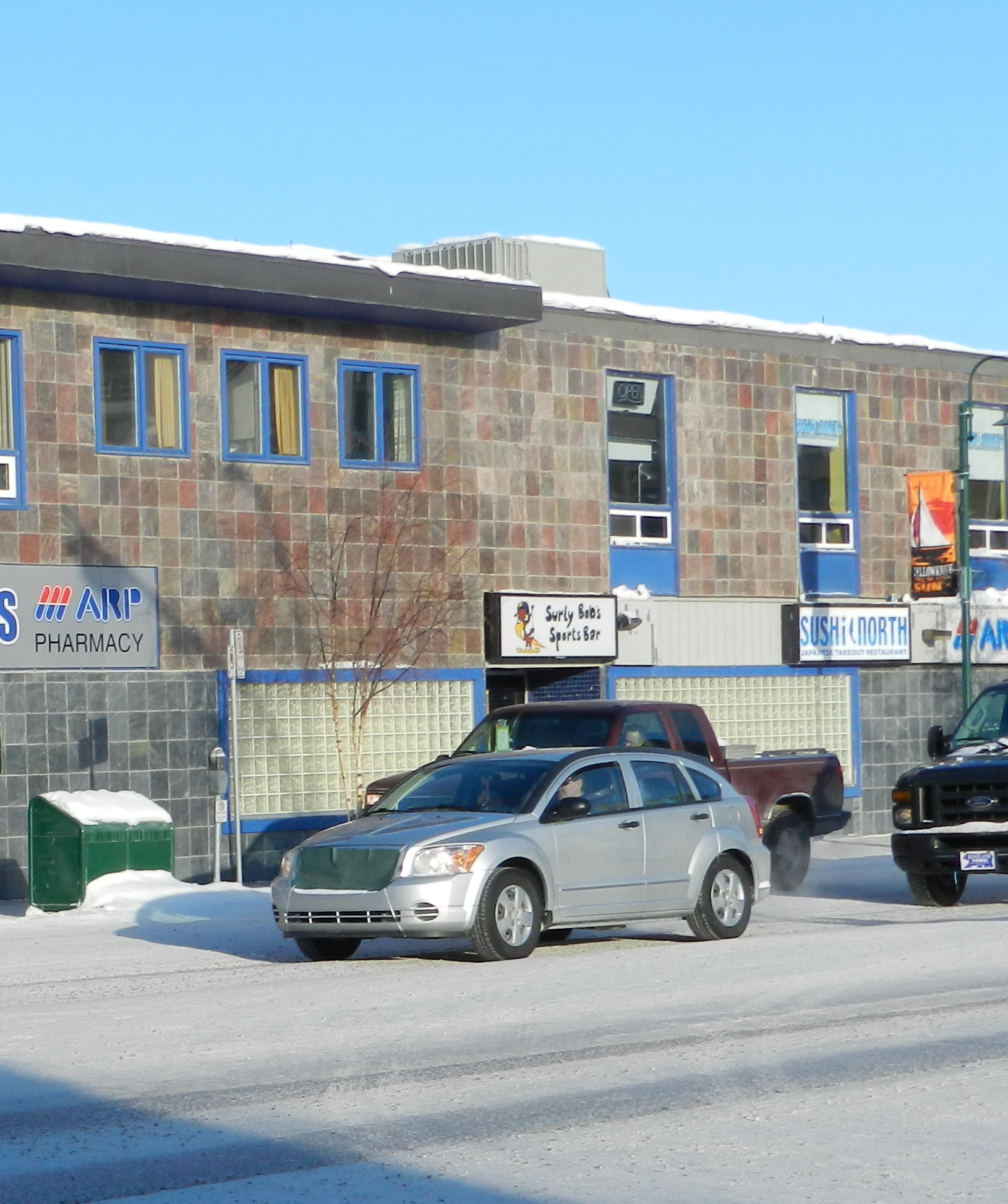
- Interactive map of Surly Bob's

Restaurant information
- Established: January 2003
- Closed: October 2012
- Owner(s): Bob Ross, Lyle Denny
- Location: 4910 50th Avenue, Yellowknife, Northwest Territories, Canada
- Coordinates: 62°27′15″N 114°22′18″W

Surly Bob's was a sports bar in Yellowknife, Northwest Territories, Canada owned by Bob Ross and Lyle Denny. It closed in October 2012. It served typical pub food and sponsored a basketball team, also named the Surly Bob's. The bar was located at 4910 50th Ave.

== History ==
=== Precursors (1969 - 2003) ===
The commercial space for the establishment was created in 1968, when Doug Finlayson built an extension onto Sutherland's Drugstore at the corner of Franklin Avenue and 50th Street, which included commercial space below and above street level. The first restaurant in the lower floor of the building was founded by Finlayson in 1969, as The Hoist Room Pub and Grill. In the 1980s, it was also known as Millie's Hoist Room, after Millie Rodgers, the first female hoist operator at the Con Mine. In 1990, former NHL player Vic Mercredi took over the Hoist Room space and opened the "Overtime Sports Bar", which closed the following year. A new restaurant, known as "The Bistro on Franklin", operated from 1992 to 2000. In 2000, the restaurant became known as Jose Loco's, when it specialized in Mexican cuisine.

=== Surly Bob's (2003 - 2012) ===
In January 2003, Lyle Denny and Bob Ross acquired Jose Loco's and converted it into a sports bar; in 2006, they renamed to restaurant "Surly Bob's" after Ross. It had a full kitchen and Friday and Saturday nights were known as Lobster Night. In 2012, Ross quit the business, citing exhaustion; after several months, Lyle quit too, closing Surly Bob's in October 2012.

=== The Cellar (2013 - 2018) ===
Following the closure of Surly Bob's, Dale Bardeau, the former manager of the Black Knight Pub on 49th Street, opened his own restaurant in the space, The Cellar Bar and Grill. On 8 August 2013, Kyle Thomas reviewed "The Cellar", stating that the food was "good, but generic". The Cellar offered a veggie burger along with a homemade vegan soup special which was different every day. The bar was closed on Sundays and Mondays.

In 2018, The Cellar Bar and Grill was set to have a change in ownership, as Bardeau planned to move to Winnipeg. In talks to take over the bar, one party sought to maintain the bar as-is, while the other would potentially close the bar for several weeks for a rebranding. Neither offer went through, and The Cellar closed in May 2018.

=== Savannah's Family Restaurant (2019 - 2021) ===
On 18 March 2019, the bar reopened as "Savannah's Family Restaurant". It served East African and Middle Eastern cuisine, including halal meat (goat, lamb, chicken, and fish), injera, lentils, and a veggie burger. It was owned and operated by husband and wife Savannah Perna and Mohamed Mohamed.

As of May 2019, the Fat Fox Café was considering a move there, having closed its doors on 50 Street on 19 May 2018, due to issues with its premises.

However, as of October 2020, Savannah's Family Restaurant was still open, now serving hamburgers, wings, and East Indian cuisines, such as samosas and goat curry. According to Tripadvisor reviews, "the food is beautifully spiced, hot, and served quickly"; they serve "nice Somali flavors", and the restaurant boasts a "very friendly owner and staff" The restaurant was inspected on 29 October 2020.

On 21 September 2020, the Yellowknife Chamber of Commerce announced that Savannah's Family Restaurant was nominated for the 2020 "Resilient New Business Award" by the public. Until 5 October 2020, members of the public could vote online to select who would receive the award.

On 5 November 2021, it was announced on Facebook, and subsequently reported by Cabin Radio, that Savannah’s last day of operation would be on 3 December 2021, as the owners were moving their family to Edmonton.

=== Safari Foods Family Restaurant and Lounge (2022 - 2024) ===
In July 2022, Sureya Luyombo opened Safari Foods Family Restaurant and Lounge, a restaurant serving Indo-African cuisine, in the space vacated by Savannah's. Business was affected by the evacuation of the city in the summer of 2023, and the restaurant closed in early 2024, with its final message on its Facebook page appearing on March 25 of that year.

=== The Underground (2024–present) ===
In October 2024, a new bar, restaurant and performance space, "The Underground", was opened in the space by Gary Michel and Josh Judas, who operated a Dene frybread tacos company called Frybread Kings before opening the restaurant. The menu is a blend of Mexican and Indigenous foods. The Underground now has a reputation as downtown Yellowknife's "art bar", frequently hosting live music, comedy, burlesque and drag shows.
