= Frilu =

Restaurant in Markham, Ontario, Canada

- Interactive map of Frilu

Restaurant information
- Established: June 8, 2018
- Closed: July 31, 2024
- Owner: John-Vincent Troiano
- Head chef: John-Vincent Troiano
- Chef: So Sakata
- Rating: (Michelin Guide, 2022-2023)
- Location: 7713 Yonge Street, Markham, L3T 2C4, Canada
- Coordinates: 43°48′56.6″N 79°25′26.8″W
- Other information: Seasonal 12-14 course prix-fix tasting menu
- Website: www.frilurestaurant.com

Frilu was a restaurant in Markham, Ontario, Canada. The restaurant had received a Michelin star in 2022, and retained it in 2023. The restaurant also earned a 'Green Star', which recognizes restaurants for their leadership in sustainability, in the 2023 edition of the Guide.

Frilu was the only Michelin-starred restaurant in Ontario located outside of the city limits proper of the City of Toronto. Frilu closed its doors in July 2024, with the owners citing wanting to focus on other ventures. Frilu is the first Michelin-starred restaurant in Canada to close.

== See also ==
- List of Michelin-starred restaurants in Toronto
