= Kappo Sato =

Japanese restaurant in Toronto, Ontario, Canada

- Interactive map of Kappo Sato

Restaurant information
- Head chef: Takeshi Sato
- Food type: Japanese
- Rating: (Michelin Guide)
- Location: 575 Mount Pleasant Road, Toronto, Ontario, Canada
- Coordinates: 43°42′12.5″N 79°23′16.8″W
- Website: kapposato.com

Kappo Sato is a Japanese restaurant in Toronto, Ontario, Canada. The restaurant has received a Michelin star.

== See also ==
- List of Japanese restaurants
- List of Michelin-starred restaurants in Toronto
