= Les Fougères =

Restaurant in Chelsea, Quebec, Canada

- Interactive map of Les Fougères

Restaurant information
- Established: 1993
- Owners: Charlie Part; Jennifer Warren-Part
- Head chef: Simon Beaudry
- Food type: Canadian; Quebecois
- Location: 783 Quebec Rte 105, Chelsea, Quebec, Canada
- Coordinates: 45°31′30.83″N 75°47′57.56″W
- Seating capacity: 48
- Website: www.fougeres.com

Les Fougères is a farm-to-table Canadian restaurant located in the town of Chelsea, Quebec, part of the Ottawa-Gatineau metro area.

== History ==
The restaurant was opened in 1993 by husband-and-wife couple Charlie Part and Jennifer Warren-Part. The pair were originally from Toronto and operated a restaurant in the city's Beaches neighbourhood, before moving to the Quebec countryside north of Ottawa to raise their family. The couple purchased a plot of land which used to house an old gas station, converting it into the restaurant. Charlie Part served as the chef of the restaurant in its first years in operation.

Les Fougères focuses on seasonal, farm-to-table cooking, using local ingredients sourced entirely from the Ottawa-Gatineau area, such as seared foie gras, veal sweetbreads and Québec duck. The restaurant is surrounded by a garden on its property, from which many of its ingredients are also used in the menu.

In its first years of operation, the restaurant was considered a more formal and 'white tablecloth' establishment, before rejigging its concept in 2015 to make its atmosphere more approachable for diners, including with an open kitchen.

Following Part's retirement as head chef in 2017, the kitchen was headed by Yannick La Salle, who helped elevate the restaurant's reputation as a culinary destination and won the Canadian Culinary Championships in 2019. La Salle, who grew up locally in the Outaouais and had also cooked at Michelin-starred restaurants in France, left the restaurant in the summer of 2022 to become the head chef at the Supreme Court of Canada.

After La Salle's departure, Blake Williams became the restaurant's head chef. As of 2025, Simon Beaudry became the head chef of the restaurant. Beaudry previously served as Williams' sous chef.

== Recognition ==
Writing for the Ottawa Citizen in 2023, restaurant critic Peter Hum praised Les Fougères for maintaining its high standards despite the departure of its acclaimed former chef, Yannick La Salle. He highlighted the restaurant’s signature dishes, including the Mouth of the St. Lawrence, duck confit, and Fougères salad, noting that they remain as refined and satisfying as ever. Hum also commended then-chef Blake Williams for his skillfully crafted dishes, such as the Beverly Farms lamb duo and scallop crudo, concluding that Les Fougères continues to offer an exceptional dining experience. Hum also reviewed the restaurant in 2016, commending the restaurant's food and service as "polished."

Montreal based culinary magazine Tastet describes Les Fougères as a must-visit destination that beautifully showcases the terroir of the Outaouais region. Praising its farm-to-table philosophy, seasonal menu, and stunning natural setting, the review highlights the restaurant’s enduring excellence and its place among Canada’s top dining establishments.

The New York Times highlighted Les Fougeres in a list it compiled from reader feedback on restaurants that became "local institutions."

United States based food and drink publication Eater listed Les Fougères among its "24 Best Restaurants in [the Ottawa area]," praising the hyperlocal ingredients and stating that it was "arguably the region’s best spot for a romantic evening".

=== Canada's 100 Best Restaurants Ranking ===
Les Fougères has occasionally ranked on Canada's 100 Best Restaurants list since the list's debut in 2015. It reached a peak of #61 in Canada in the 2020 publication. As of 2024, the restaurant is not ranked on the list.

Les Fougères
Year	Rank	Change
2015	79	new
2016	▼ No Rank	
2017	▼ No Rank	
2018	98	▲ re-entry
2019	▼ No Rank	
2020	61	▲ re-entry
2021	No List	
2022	77	▼16
2023	▼ No Rank	
2024	▼ No Rank	
2025	▼ No Rank	
2026	▼ No Rank	
