= Atelier (Ottawa restaurant) =

Restaurant in Ottawa, Ontario, Canada

- Interactive map of Atelier

Restaurant information
- Established: November 13, 2008
- Owner: Marc Lepine
- Manager: Devon Bowers-Krishnan
- Head chef: Marc Lepine
- Food type: Modern
- Location: 540 Rochester St., Ottawa, Ontario, Canada
- Coordinates: 45°23′58.45″N 75°42′23.52″W
- Seating capacity: 45
- Website: www.atelierrestaurant.ca

Atelier is a restaurant located in the Centretown West neighbourhood of Ottawa, Ontario.

== History ==
The business was opened in the fall of 2008 by chef-owner Marc Lepine, who previously served as the executive chef of Ottawa's Courtyard restaurant. Since its opening, Atelier has had a focus on molecular gastronomy, offering a multi-course tasting menu to guests.

In its first years of operation, the restaurant offered a 12 course menu. In 2019, the restaurant opened a six seat private dining room within the restaurant called THRU, marketed as an interactive fine dining experience featuring a 50-item tasting menu.

In 2021, the restaurant rebooted it tasting menu and concept entirely, instead offering a "rapid-fire" 44 course experience consisting of small bites.

The business originally sat 20 guests in its dining room, which was expanded to seat 45 in 2016.

== Recognition ==
The restaurant was ranked #4 in Air Canada's annual list of 10 best new restaurants in Canada in 2009. Lepine has cited this recommendation as critical in the restaurant getting its footing, and bringing more customers to the business.

Ottawa Citizen restaurant critic Peter Hum has lauded Atelier as being "widely regarded as the city’s finest restaurant." Hum also praised its standout dishes such as scallop croquettes, wagyu beef short rib, and a cauliflower soup course, while also noting its exceptional service and attention to detail. He highlighted the restaurant’s innovative approach to ingredients and presentation, though he observed that some vegetarian alternatives lacked the complexity of their meat-based counterparts.

Lesley Chesterman, restaurant critic for the Montreal Gazette described Atelier as "Ottawa’s most famous gastronomic hot spot," highlighting its elaborate tasting menu and artistic presentation. While noting its appeal to dedicated food enthusiasts, she praised chef Marc Lepine’s diverse and flavorful menu, complemented by carefully curated wine pairings.

While head chef at Atelier, Lepine has twice won the Canadian Culinary Championships (formerly: Gold Medal Plates) - in 2012 and 2016. The Canadian Culinary Championships is an annual competition in which chefs from across Canada compete by presenting dishes evaluated by a panel of restaurant critics. Following his 2012 win, Lepine stated that it resulted in Atelier selling out its dining room for "about a year."

=== Canada's 100 Best Restaurants Ranking ===
Atelier has been a consistent presence on Canada's 100 Best Restaurants list since it began publishing in 2015. It was also the highest ranked restaurant in Ottawa on the list that year. The restaurant debuted in the inaugural list at #19, its highest ranking in the annual publication. As of 2026, Atelier is ranked #54.

Atelier
Year	Rank	Change
2015	19	new
2016	69	▼50
2017	60	▲9
2018	40	▲20
2019	25	▲15
2020	32	▼7
2021	No List	
2022	56	▼24
2023	88	▼32
2024	43	▲45
2025	41	▲2
2026	54	▼13
