= Shoushin =

Restaurant in Toronto, Ontario, Canada

- Interactive map of Shoushin

Restaurant information
- Owner: Jackie Lin
- Head chef: Jackie Lin
- Food type: Japanese
- Rating: (Michelin Guide)
- Location: 3328 Yonge Street, Toronto, M4N 2M4, Canada
- Coordinates: 43°43′53″N 79°24′14.7″W
- Website: shoushin.ca

Shoushin is a Japanese restaurant in Toronto, Ontario, Canada. The restaurant serves sushi and has received a Michelin star. Jackie Lin is the owner and head chef.

== Recognition ==
=== Canada's 100 Best Restaurants Ranking ===
Shoushin
Year	Rank	Change
2017	85	new
2018	73	▲12
2019	67	▲6
2020	87	▼20
2021	No List	
2022	19	▲68
2023	40	▼21
2024	▼ No Rank	
2025	62	▲ re-entry
2026	▼ No Rank	

== See also ==
- List of Japanese restaurants
- List of Michelin-starred restaurants in Toronto
