= St. Lawrence (restaurant) =

French-Canadian restaurant in Vancouver

Coordinates: 49.2833°N 123.0980°W

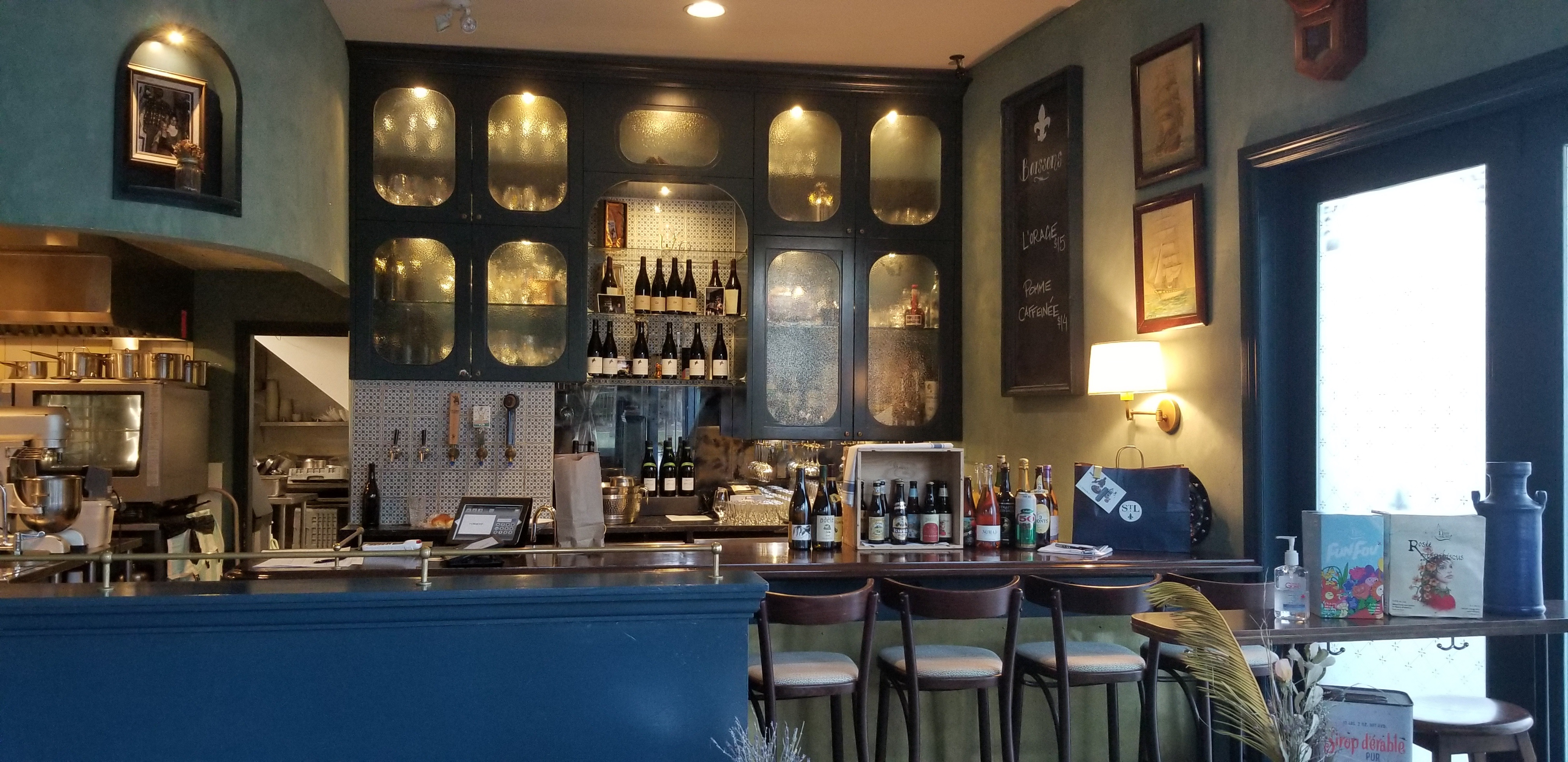
Bar area and part of kitchen

St. Lawrence is a French-Canadian restaurant in the Japantown neighbourhood of Vancouver, British Columbia. It opened in June 2017. Located on the ground floor of a heritage building at 269 Powell St, originally a Japanese general store, St. Lawrence serves a blend of traditional Québécois dishes and French haute cuisine. Executive chef and owner J.C. Poirier began developing the concept for St. Lawrence in 2013, and sought with both the menu and the décor to replicate the feeling of being inside a rural French home and eating a country-style meal. The interior, which features a blue and green colour scheme and numerous keepsakes and photographs, was developed by Vancouver-based studio Ste. Marie.

The menu at St. Lawrence is primarily concentrated on rich, hearty fare served in large portions, running counter to the predominant stereotype of Vancouver cuisine as light and health-focused. Lesser-known dishes and uncommon cuts of meat like sweetbreads are featured in order to showcase Quebecois cuisine beyond its most famous dish, poutine. The plating style is deliberately basic, and presentation of many dishes incorporates playful touches inspired by the culture of Quebec, such as the tourtière, served with a miniature flag of the Montreal Canadiens hockey team, a Quebecois cultural icon.

St. Lawrence has been a critical success since it opened. It has been highly-ranked on several Canadian "best restaurant" lists, and was awarded one Michelin star in 2022. It has ranked on the Canada's 100 Best list since its first eligible year, and in 2020 it was ranked the second-best restaurant in Canada. Critics have highlighted the richness of the dishes, which many noted felt like "comfort food", as well as the rustic interior design. Some critics noted that the high menu prices came at an apparent contrast to the rustic aesthetic.

== Description and development ==
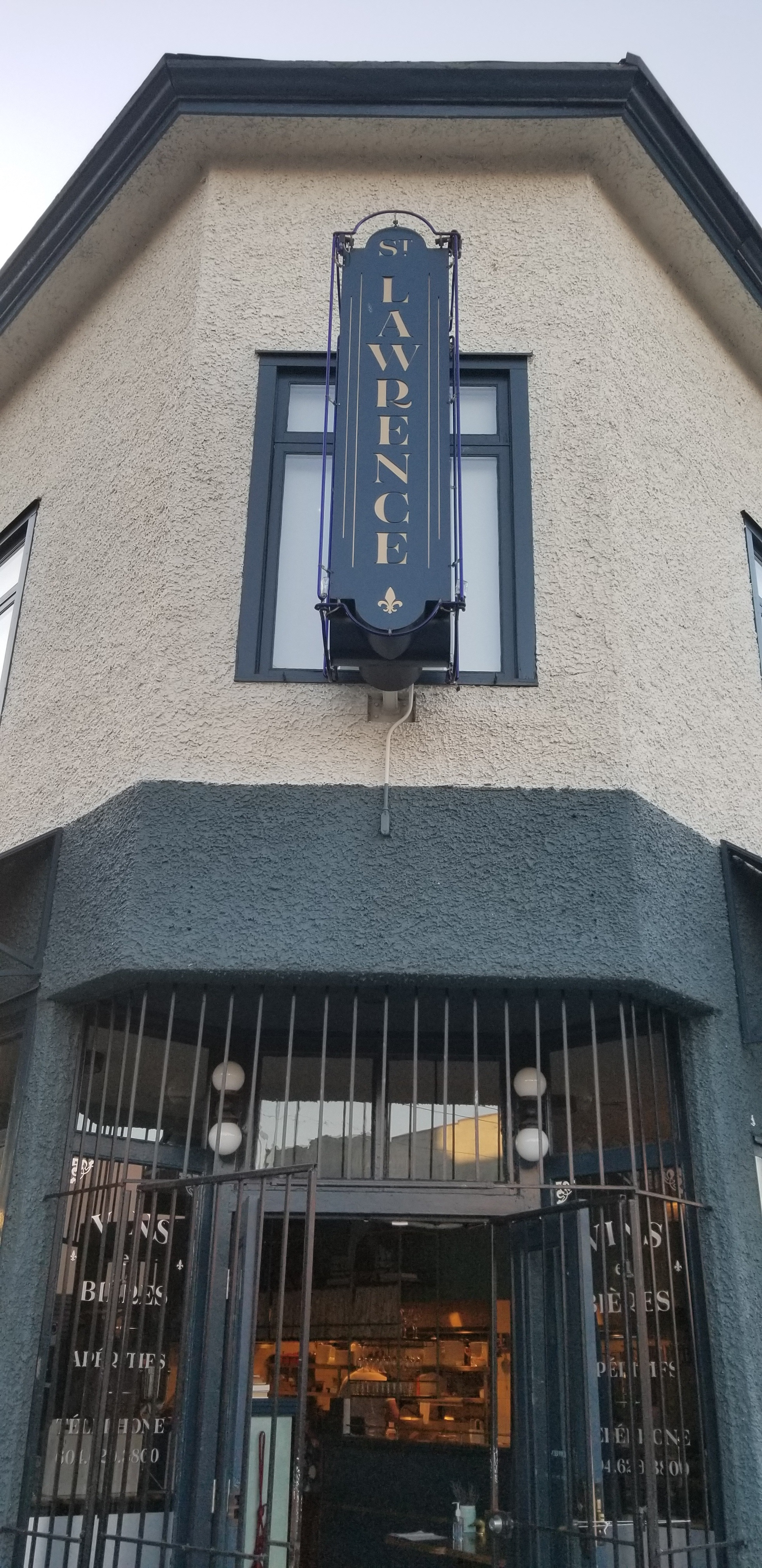
Front entrance and signage

St. Lawrence is located on the ground floor of a heritage building at 269 Powell St, in the Japantown neighbourhood of Vancouver, British Columbia. The restaurant, which seats 44, including the six seats at the bar, serves French-Canadian cuisine. It opened in June 2017. The staff are primarily French speakers from Quebec or France.

Executive chef and owner J.C. Poirier, formerly of Rob Feenie's restaurant Lumière, began to develop the concept for St. Lawrence in 2013. At the time, he was already the co-owner of Railtown Italian restaurant Ask For Luigi with the Kitchen Table Restaurants group but felt there was "something missing". After making a rarely-seen classic French dessert called oeufs à la neige for a dinner party, he felt inspired to study "the old classics and honour those traditions by bringing them back to life with a new energy". Poirier spent the next two years studying classical French cuisine in order to develop the foundation of the menu. The restaurant was initially opened in partnership, but Poirier later bought out the partners and became sole owner.

== Design ==
The restaurant was designed by Craig Straghetta's Vancouver-based studio Ste. Marie, which designed Poirier's earlier restaurant Ask For Luigi, as well as other Vancouver restaurants such as Kissa Tanto and Botanist. Poirier asked for a space that did not feel designed and looked "like it's always been there", so Straghetta worked to invoke the feeling of a cozy rural home "turned into a restaurant in the middle of the city". The original colour scheme for the restaurant used cream and faded yellow, but was changed to a blue and green palette after the designers sampled the proposed menu. The French-speaking staff and French background music are intended to make patrons feel as if they are not in Vancouver. Reviewers have described the environment as having a similar feeling to eateries in Montreal or Quebec City, Quebec.

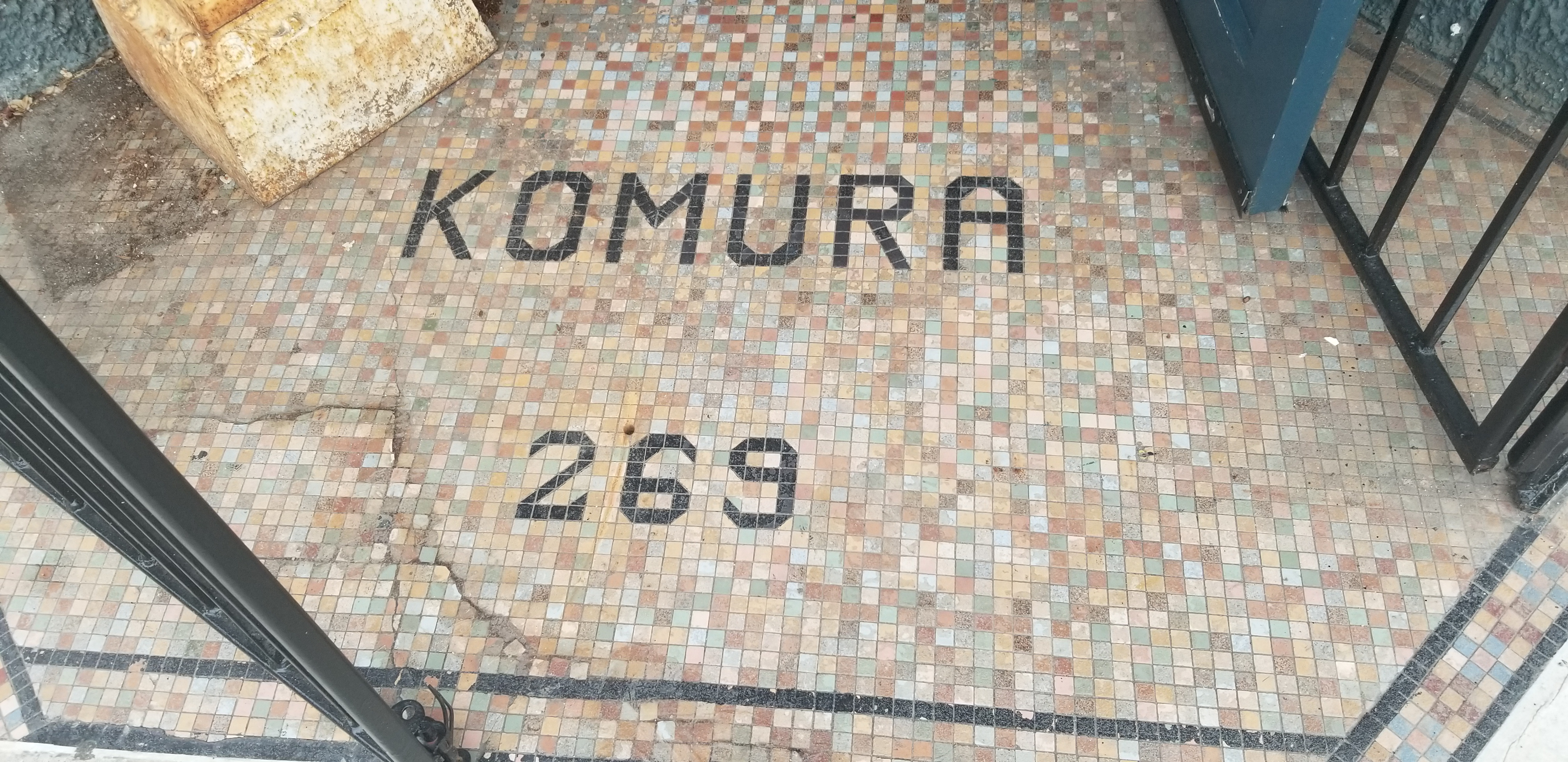
Exterior tiling, showing address and original building name

The building at 269 Powell St. was built in 1905 and originally housed the Komura Bros. General Store, an anchor store for Vancouver's Japanese community. In 1942, the family was forced out of the building when the Canadian government remanded Japanese-Canadians to internment camps following the Canadian declaration of war on Japan at the start of World War II. The exterior of St. Lawrence retains the original tiling outside the front door, including the word "Komura". The metal gates surrounding the door are also original. The door and exterior walls are painted a deep blue-green, and a large cream-and-black sign with the restaurant's name hangs above the door on the building's second floor.

The interior walls are green washed plaster, and the ceiling is light grey. The woodwork and cabinetry is painted glossy royal blue, including a large piece of millwork inspired by antique furniture, which hangs on the back wall. The light fixtures are brass. The restaurant is also decorated with fleur-de-lis symbols. The inside of the restaurant is filled with small antiques and tchotchkes. Most of these are drawn from Poirier's personal collection, but others were sourced from local antique shops. Photographs from his childhood in Saint-Jérôme, Quebec, and pastoral oil paintings are displayed on the walls throughout. A reviewer described the overall impression as being of an old country kitchen crammed with keepsakes accrued over time.

== Cuisine ==
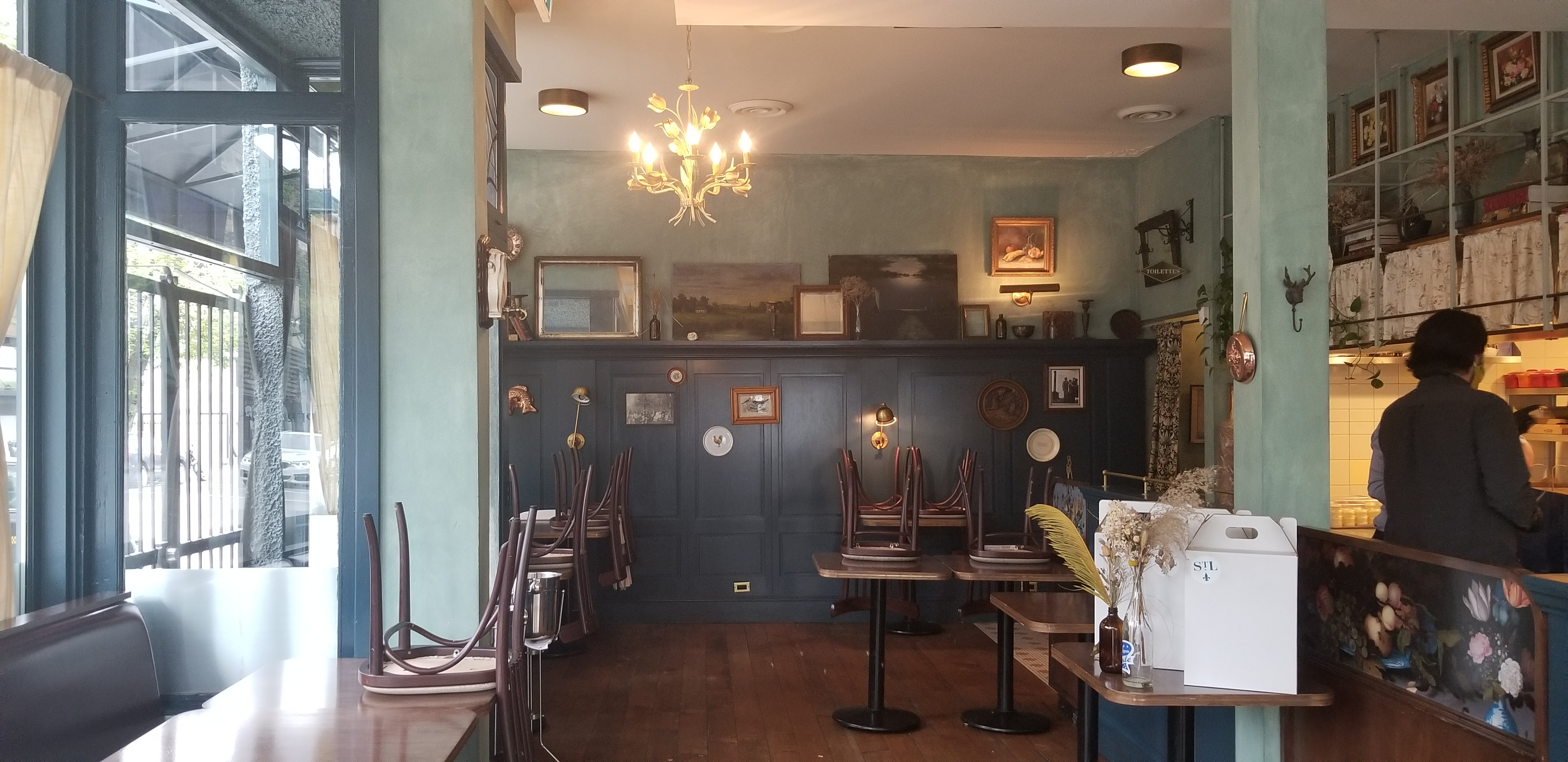
Dining area cleared of chairs and tables

The menu at St. Lawrence leans toward hearty, protein-focused food, which Poirier calls cuisine de campagne ("cuisine of the countryside"). The large portions and focus on rich flavors runs counter to the predominant stereotype of Vancouver cuisine as light and health-focused. The menu deliberately omits poutine in an effort to showcase Quebecois cuisine beyond its most famous dish, instead serving pommes duchesse with cheese curds and gravy. Less common cuts of meat, such as sweetbreads, calf and chicken livers, and tongue, appear both on the regular menu and as special features.

Each meal is preceded by an amuse-bouche of cretons (spiced pork spread) served with sourdough and house-made grainy mustard. Permanent menu items include venison tourtière, mushroom vol-au-vent, and a daily pâté en croûte. Feature items are often more elaborate, for example lobster Newberg, cailles en sarcophage ("quails in a sarcophagus"), and a ling cod fillet for two. Many of the dishes are revived classics rarely found in modern restaurants.

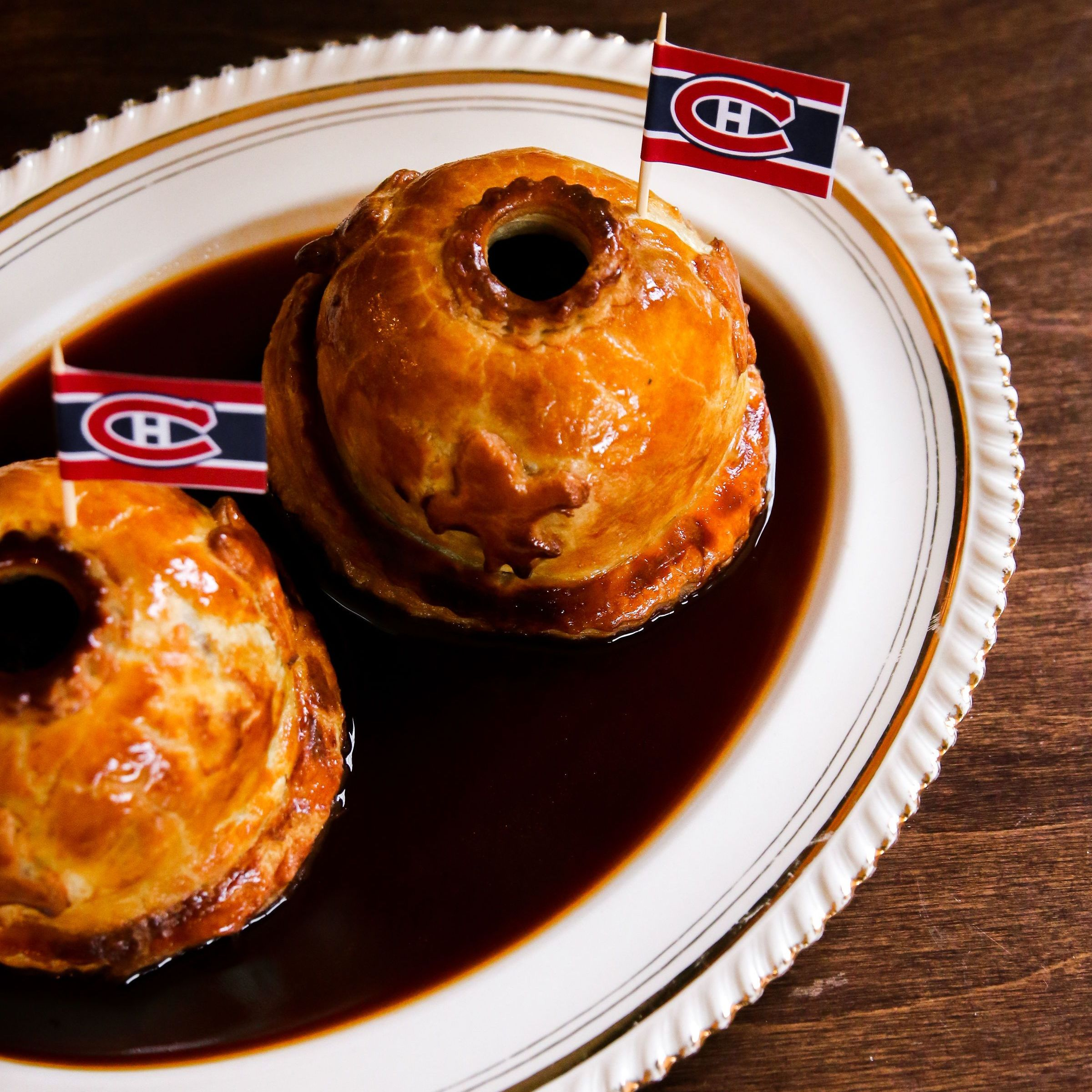
Tourtière with Montreal Canadiens flag

St. Lawrence makes use of sauces ranging from cream and butter-based sauces to lighter gravies like au jus. Since most dishes are paired with their own particular sauce, the restaurant can have as many as ten different sauces cooking each night. The grilled pork chop, for example, is dressed with sauce charcutière ("butcher's sauce"), and the ling cod with a saffron sauce.

Like the main courses, the desserts are old-fashioned and served in large portions. The signature desserts are a lattice-topped classic sugar pie and a rice pudding with salted caramel, which comes with small pastries called pets de sœurs ("nun's farts"). The bar serves exclusively French wines, a short list of classic cognac-based cocktails, and various beers and ciders including Labatt 50, regarded as a staple beer for the working class in Quebec. A small selection of Japanese whisky is also available, a nod to the restaurant's location in historic Japantown.

The plating style at St. Lawrence is simple and unpretentious. Poirier told the Vancouver Sun that "smart presentation doesn't matter to me—food must be delicious". The presentation of many dishes incorporates playful touches inspired by the culture of Quebec. The tourtière is served with a miniature flag of the Montreal Canadiens hockey team, a cultural icon for the Quebecois, and a miniature bottle of Heinz Tomato Ketchup on the side. The oreilles de crisse (deep-fried pork rinds) are served in a maple syrup can, an object which has been described as "Canada in a can".

=== Special menus ===
In January 2020, St. Lawrence held a series of "cabane a sucre" dinners, with a menu modelled after the traditional fare served at Quebecois sugar shacks during the maple syrup harvesting season. During these dinners, the restaurant was set up for family-style long table dining, and used checkered tablecloths to imitate the look of sugar shack diners.

During the 2020–2021 COVID-19 pandemic in British Columbia, there were several periods of restrictions on indoor dining, beginning in April 2020. St. Lawrence began to offer take-out dinners during these closures. The restaurant re-opened for dine-in service in May 2020, but continued to offer take-out. The dine-in menu was adjusted from à la carte (individual ordering of dishes from a menu with several options) to table d'hôte (limited options from a pre-set menu). In February 2021, St. Lawrence offered a menu based on the cuisine of Lyon, France. This menu was intended to be the first in a series based on regions of France, which was cancelled due to the re-imposition of indoor dining restrictions.

== Reception ==
Mis Stainsby of the Vancouver Sun remarked that "St. Lawrence is so plainly [Poirier's] passion project ... It's the food he grew up with, although amped up in sophistication and using the best of ingredients." Of the interior, Annie Quigley of Remodelista wrote, "This is what I imagine it might feel like to dine inside an Impressionist painting." Vancouver Magazine wrote that it "is the intersection of a chef at the top of his powers with an owner who knows exactly how far his customers are willing to go with him." Nancy Matsumoto of EnRoute wrote, "Here, comfort food is the lingua franca." Guy Saddy of Conde Nast Traveler described the restaurant as "not swish" but found the food both "unpretentious" and "exquisite".

Food critics have specifically highlighted the richness of the dishes at St. Lawrence. Writing for the Asian Pacific Post, Grace Cheung was particularly fond of several menu items featuring cheese. Gill called the restaurant "excessively rich, intensely fastidious, insanely delicious". Lindsay Anderson of Bon Appétit warned diners not to make plans after eating at St. Lawrence, saying that the rich food was "guaranteed to put you to bed," although Gail Johnson of The Georgia Straight suggested a post-dinner walk along Vancouver's seawall.

Critics have pointed out that the restaurant's high prices come at an apparent contrast to its rustic aesthetic. Saddy noted that the French wine bottles were "not cheap". Drinking a glass's worth would be much more affordable, wrote Saddy; the choices for this were "modest" but "well-chosen". Neal McLennan of Vancouver Magazine found the bill for two to be expensive, although he stated that it "never feels gouging." He noted that the large portions meant "we could have added a third diner for such an order without anyone going hungry."

=== Rankings and awards ===
St. Lawrence
Year	Rank	Change
2018	20	new
2019	5	▲15
2020	2	▲3
2021	No List	
2022	3	▼1
2023	6	▼3
2024	14	▼8
2025	12	▲2
2026	40	▼28

Alexandra Gill of The Globe and Mail listed St. Lawrence as her top new Vancouver restaurant for 2017. EnRoute placed the restaurant fourth on its list of the best new Canadian restaurants for 2018. Vancouver Magazine named St. Lawrence its Best New Restaurant in 2018, as well as Restaurant of the Year in 2018, 2019, and 2022. It was named Best French in 2020. Poirier was also named Chef of the Year for 2019. St. Lawrence was one of eight Vancouver restaurants to be awarded a Michelin star in 2022, the first year that the city was included in the Michelin Guide. In 2023, it was placed on La Liste, a France-based list of the best restaurants in the world. It scored 83 of 100 points and was one of only four British Columbian restaurants to make the list.

In 2018, its first eligible year, it was ranked 20th on the Canada's 100 Best Restaurants list. It has remained within the list's top ten since 2019. In 2019 (5th) and 2020 (2nd), it was the highest-ranked restaurant in Western Canada. There was no list for 2021 due to the impact of the COVID-19 pandemic in Canada. In 2022, St. Lawrence was placed 3rd in Canada.

== See also ==
- List of Michelin-starred restaurants in Vancouver
- List of restaurants in Vancouver
