= Virtuous Pie =

Canadian pizza restaurant chain

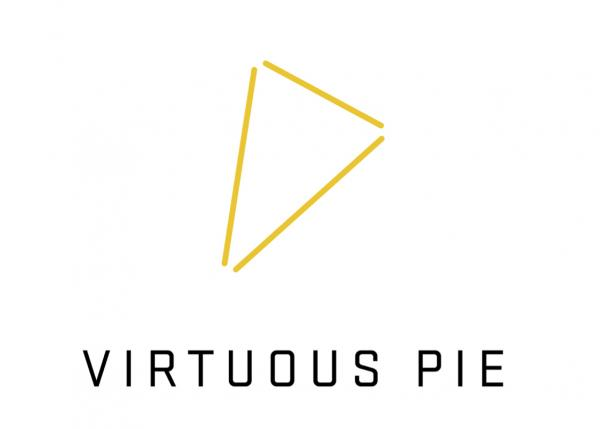
- Industry: Food and beverage
- Founded: 2015
- Headquarters: Vancouver, Canada
- Areas served: Vancouver, Cologne
- Key people: Matthew Blandy
- Number of employees: 10
- Website: Official website

Virtuous Pie is a pizza chain based in Vancouver, Canada. The business has operated in Portland, Oregon, Victoria, British Columbia, and Cologne, Germany.

== Description ==
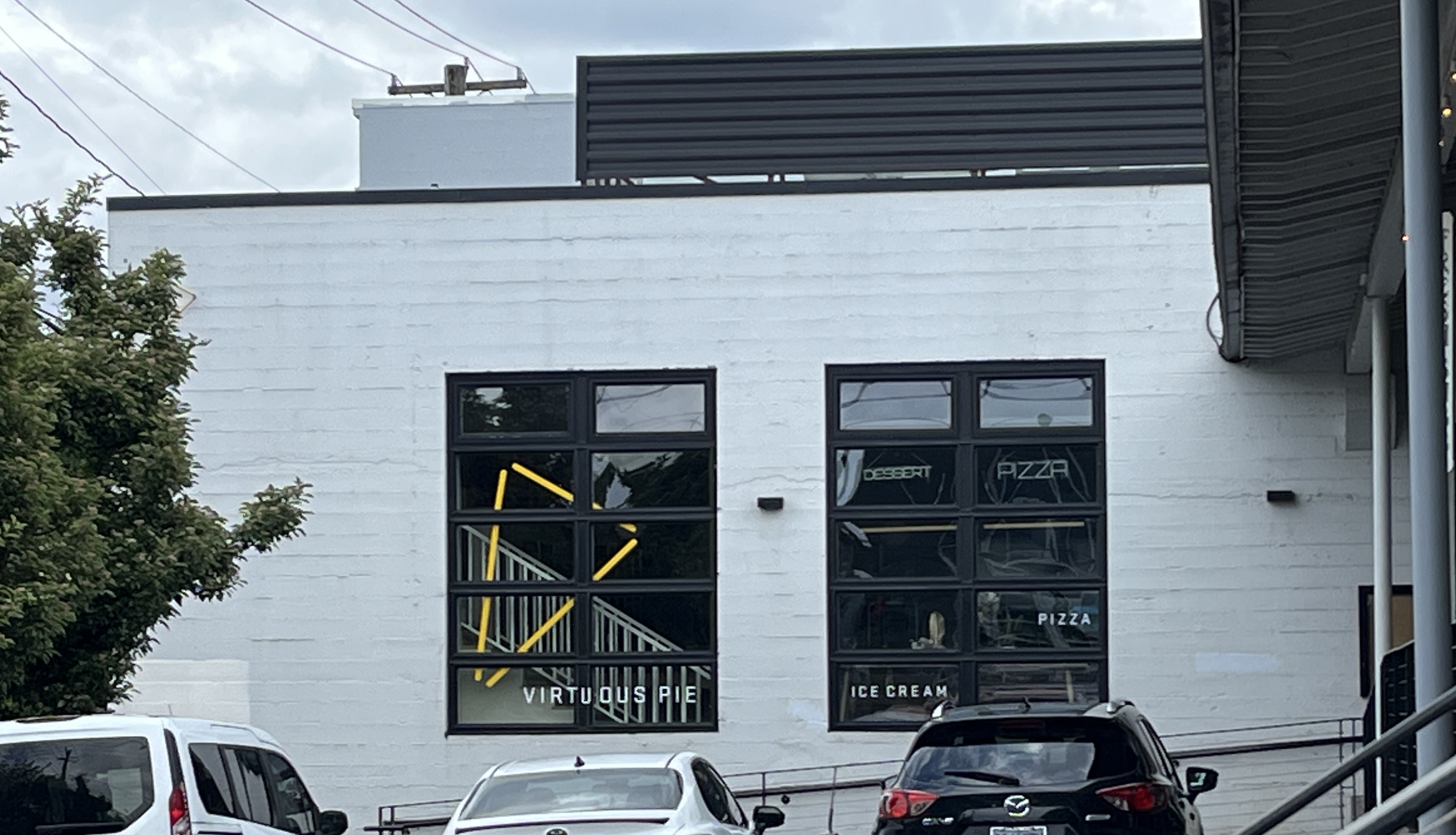
Exterior of the restaurant in Portland, Oregon, 2025

Virtuous Pie is a vegan-friendly pizzeria with multiple locations. The Kim Jack has kimchi and jackfruit. Inspired by the Netflix series Stranger Things, the Stranger Wings has buffalo cauliflower with a blue cheese sauce. Ice cream, made from a coconut and/or cashew base, is available as a sandwich, scoop, sundae, or waffle cone, or as affogato. The drink menu includes beers, ciders, cold brew, kombucha, and wines.

The 1,700 square feet (160 m^{2}) restaurant in Portland seats 38. The space has a coffee bar.

== History ==
The business was established in 2015. A second location opened in on Division Street in southeast Portland's Hosford-Abernethy neighborhood, in 2017. The menu was expanded in 2018.

== Reception ==
Virtuous Pie was named Vegetarian/Vegan Restaurant of the Year by Eater Portland in 2017. Waz Wu included the pizzeria in the website's 2021 overview of "Where to Find Knockout Vegan Pizza in Portland". Alex Frane included the restaurant in Thrillist's 2020 list of "The Absolute Best Pizza in Portland". Vancouver Magazine included Virtuous Pie in a 2021 list of the city's best vegetarian restaurants.

== See also ==
- List of restaurants in Vancouver
