= Wildlight =

Wildlight or Wild Light may refer to:

- Wildlight (photo agency), a defunct Australian photo agency
- Wildlight Kitchen + Bar, a restaurant in Vancouver, British Columbia, Canada
- Wildlight Entertainment, the developer and publisher of Highguard
- Wildlight, a neighborhood near Yulee, Florida
- Wild Light, an American indie rock band
- Wild Light (album), a 2013 album by 65daysofstatic

== See also ==
- In the Wild Light, a novel by Jeff Zentner
