= Kissa Tanto =

Restaurant in Vancouver

Coordinates: 49°16′50″N 123°05′53″W

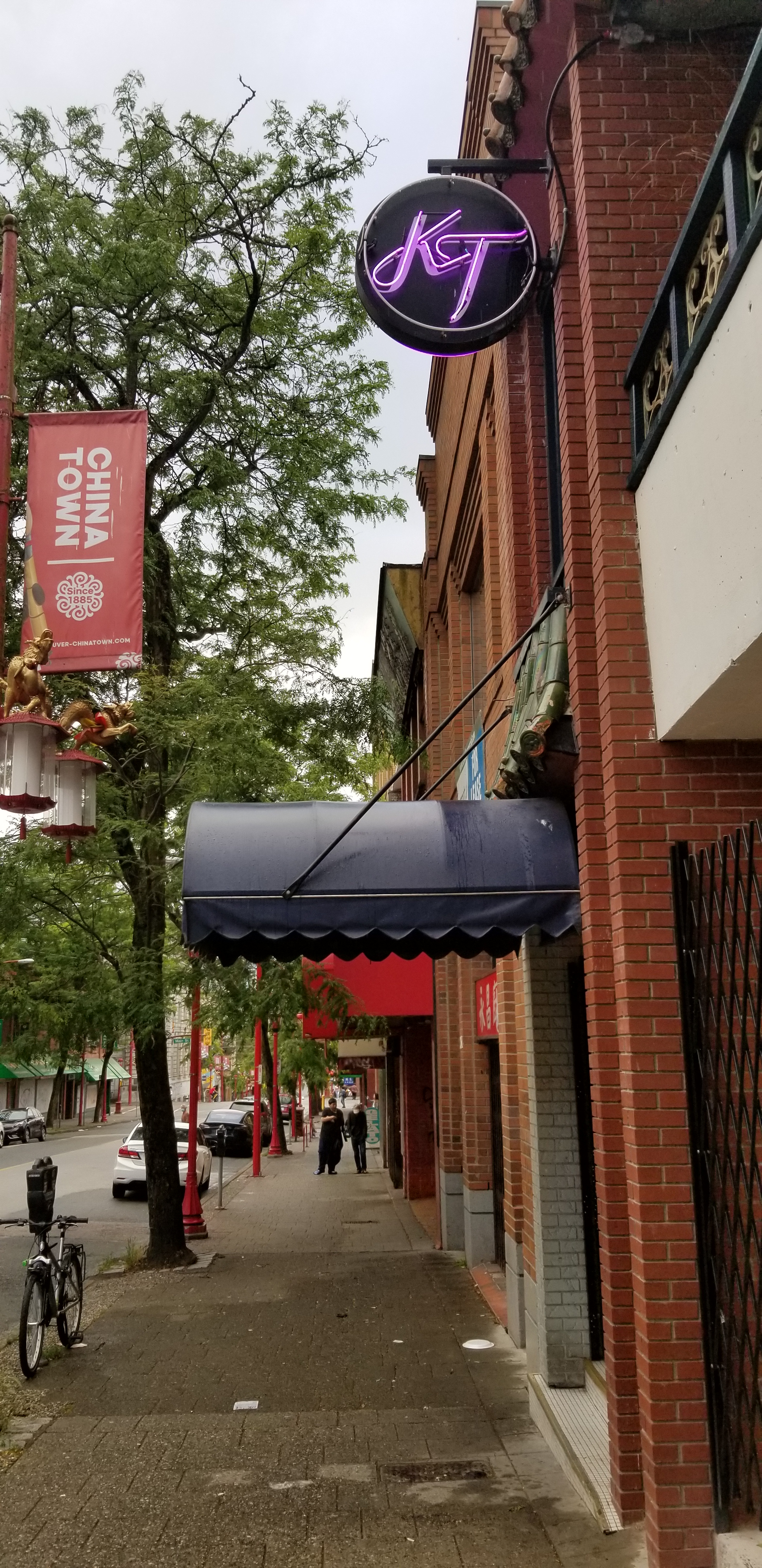
Neon purple "KT" sign and entrance awning below

Kissa Tanto is an Italian-Japanese fusion restaurant in the Chinatown neighborhood of Vancouver, British Columbia, Canada. The 80-seat restaurant, which opened in June 2016, is on the second floor of 263 E Pender St. Its name comes from the Japanese word kissa, referring to the "jazz kissa" or jazz cafes of 1960s Tokyo, and the Italian word tanto, meaning "a lot" or "so much". Kissa Tanto is co-owned by restaurateur Tannis Ling, executive chef Joël Watanabe, and sous chef Alain Chow, who collectively envisioned it as an escapist, anachronistic concept.

The restaurant's visual design was as central to its development as the menu. The unobtrusive exterior was left in a state of slight disrepair, and is marked only by a small awning and neon sign. The restaurant's interior is inspired by the mid-century modern design movement, with curved banquettes, banker's lamps, extensive use of maple and walnut, and polished brass fixtures. It references the jazz cafes which inspired its name with a glossy coved ceiling and stacks of vinyl records behind the bar in place of the traditional bar mirror.

Kissa Tanto serves a modern fusion of Italian and Japanese cuisine, a pairing that appears unusual, but has some historical and culinary basis. Both cuisines focus on simplicity, umami flavors, and local ingredients. The fusion style is flexible and intuitive; traditional ingredients from each cuisine are added to dishes from the other as required rather than attempting to follow a strict formula. The whole fried fish has been singled out by reviewers as the restaurant's signature dish.

Since its launch, Kissa Tanto has garnered positive reviews for its romantic, retro-style design philosophy and innovative menu. It has been highly ranked on several Canadian "best restaurant" lists, including the Canada's 100 Best list. In its first year, several critics named it "best new restaurant". In 2022, it was awarded one Michelin star.

== Description and development ==
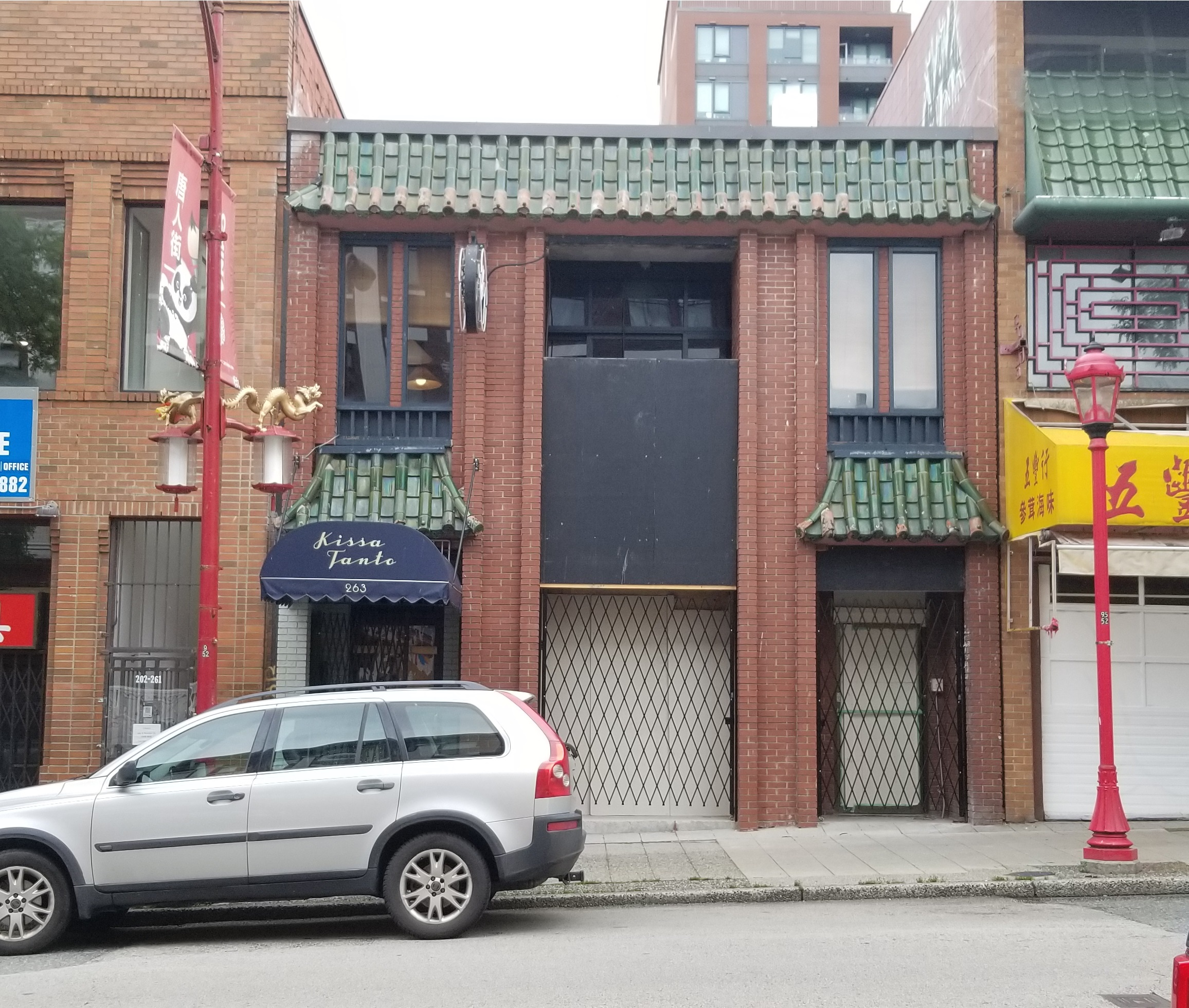
Exterior of restaurant in Chinatown

Kissa Tanto is an Italian-Japanese fusion restaurant in the Chinatown neighborhood of Vancouver, British Columbia, Canada. The 80-seat restaurant is on the second floor of 263 E Pender St. Its name comes from the Japanese word kissa (きっさ), referring in this context to the jazz kissa or jazz cafes that characterized the 1960s Tokyo jazz scene, and the Italian word tanto, meaning "a lot" or "so much".

Kissa Tanto is co-owned by restaurateur Tannis Ling, executive chef Joël Watanabe, and sous chef Alain Chow, all of whom were involved with Chinese brasserie Bao Bei, also in Chinatown. After the success of the restaurant Bao Bei, Ling, Watanabe, and Chow were interested in creating a second restaurant, but did not have a specific idea in mind. They consulted with Ste. Marie, the Vancouver-based studio which designed Bao Bei, as well as other Vancouver restaurants such as St. Lawrence, Savio Volpe and Ask for Luigi. The designers asked for a defined food concept to work with before starting to plan. Watanabe suggested Japanese-Italian: "Everybody liked it and it stuck."

The restaurant was conceived as a romantic escape from the everyday. Tannis Ling told Monocle magazine, "We imagined Kissa Tanto as a little secret hideaway." According to Watanabe, they chose the second-story location because it "hit all the right notes. Dark. Upstairs. We wanted it to be an adventure." The lease for the space, which had been empty for thirty years prior, was secured in February 2015, and the group took possession later that same year. Hiring began in October 2015. Construction was ongoing through March 2016, and the space was completed by late April, when the restaurant held its soft open. The restaurant officially opened in June 2016.

== Visual design ==
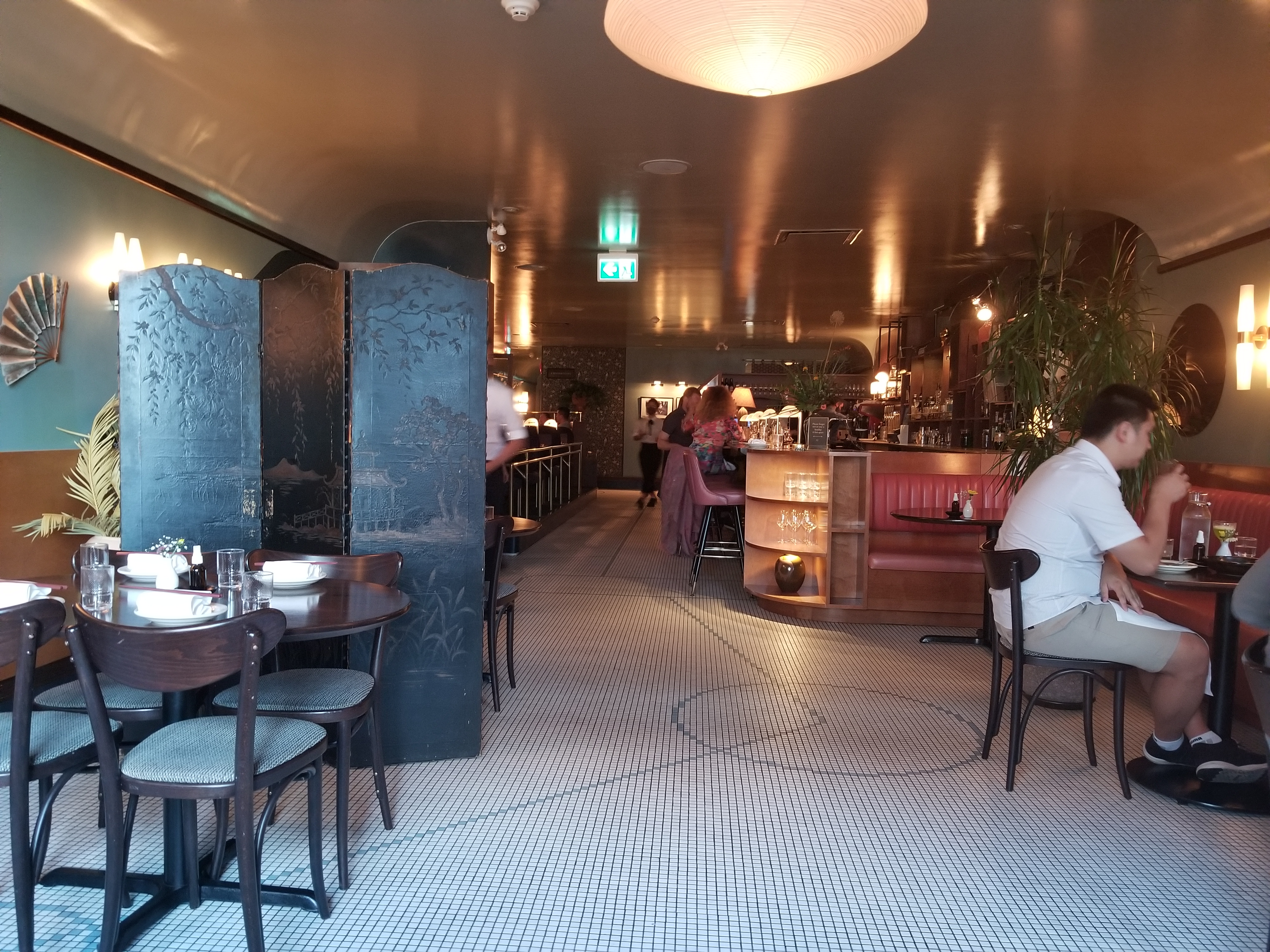
Kissa Tanto interior, early on an August evening, front of house towards the back

The exterior of Kissa Tanto is designed to be unobtrusive, blending into the neighborhood and creating a sense of discovery for patrons. The red brick building, with its jade-green Chinese-style roof tile, was left in its original condition of slight disrepair. A small purple neon sign reading "KT" and a royal-blue awning reading "Kissa Tanto" are the only outward indications that the restaurant is there. A steep staircase leads up to the restaurant proper, which is hidden behind thick blue velvet curtains.

The restaurant's interior is inspired by the mid-century modern design movement, also paying homage to the work of Italian architect Gio Ponti. Aesthetically, it references the jazz cafes which inspired its name, with specific homage to the famous Hotel Okura Tokyo. The coved ceiling, with high-gloss paint, is characteristic of those cafes. The pixellated design of the floor tiling draws inspiration from the John Gall paperback covers of Haruki Murakami novels. Food critic Pete Wells of The New York Times compared the color palette, which incorporates raspberry, blue-green, and royal blue, to that of a David Lynch film. Mid-century decorative elements include curved banquettes, banker's lamps, extensive use of maple and walnut, and polished brass fixtures. A raised, oversized dining booth called "the hot tub" by staff dominates the rear of the restaurant. Vinyl records and knick-knacks are stacked on dark wood shelves behind the bar, replacing the traditional mirror-backed bar.

Because of energy-consumption guidelines mandated by the City of Vancouver, most of the lighting in Kissa Tanto is provided by LED bulbs. The restaurant has minimal, moody lighting with only a single chandelier, otherwise using lighting at eye level and below to immerse patrons in the atmosphere. The restaurant's background music is mostly jazz, with some blues tracks.

The overall impression is of a place grounded in neither time, nor space. The aesthetic suggests the past, but without being anchored to any specific time period. Watanabe stated that the atmosphere makes diners "feel literally transported ... You feel New York or L.A. in its heyday." In their review, Canada's 100 Best agreed with the sentiment, writing "We could be anywhere—New York, Tokyo, San Francisco."

== Cuisine ==
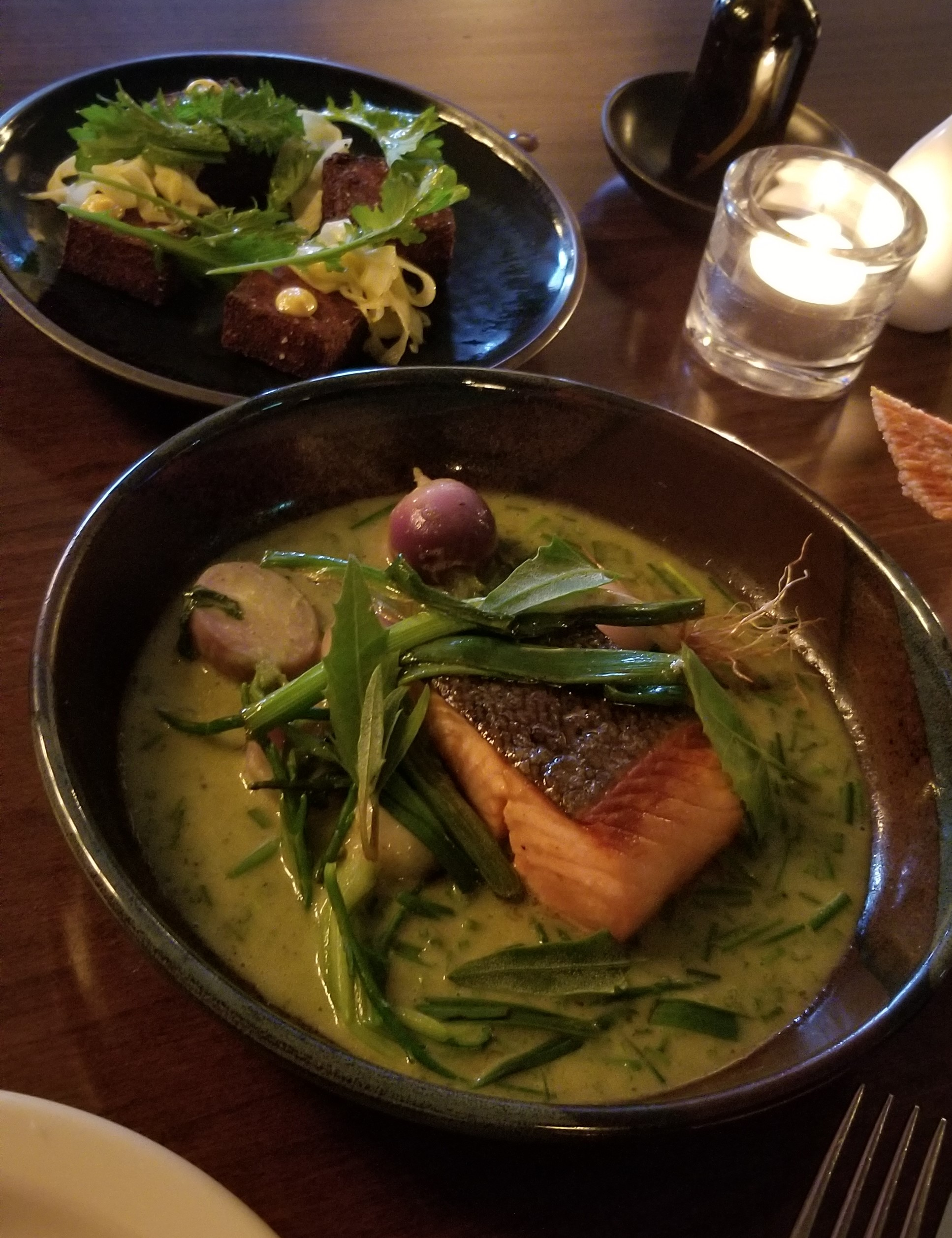
Spring salmon with seaweed butter (front) and crispy polenta squares (back)

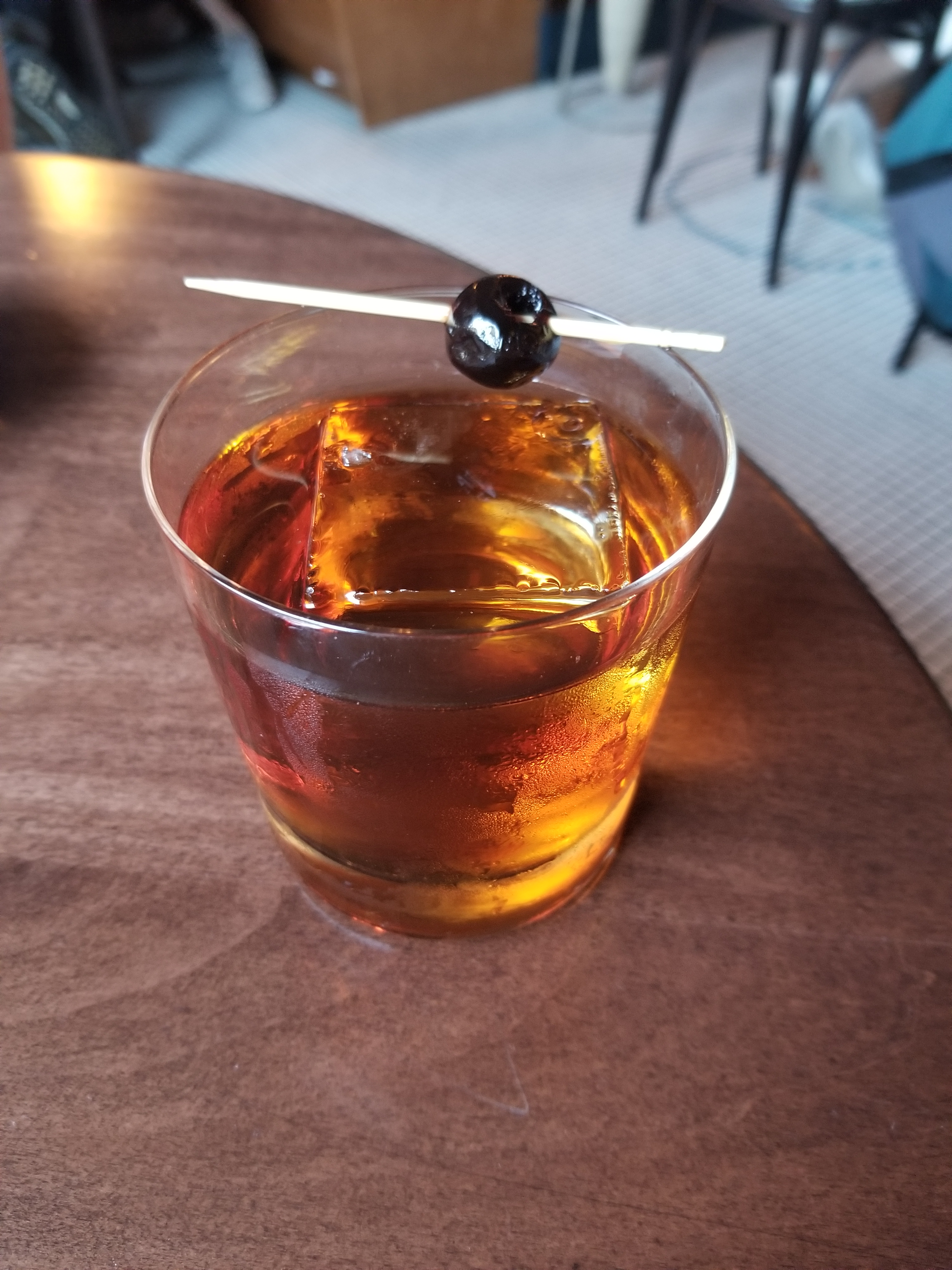
"Dark End of the Street" cocktail, a boulevardier variation that uses Japanese whisky

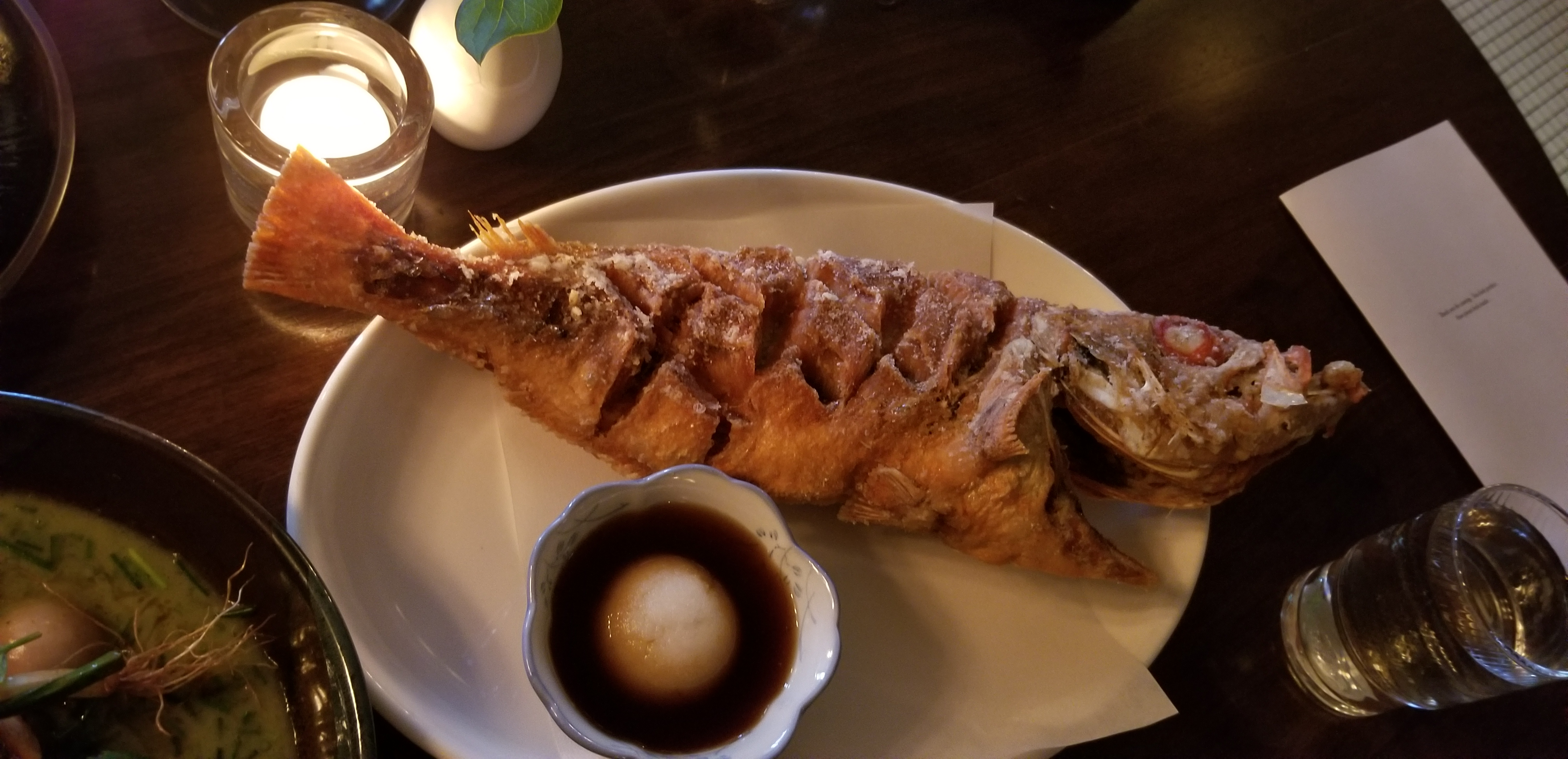
Fried whole fish with daikon soy sauce

Kissa Tanto serves a modern fusion of Italian and Japanese cuisine, a pairing that appears unusual, but has some historical and culinary basis. Italian food, known as itameshi, has been popular in Japan since the 1920s, and Italian ingredients are sometimes incorporated into Japanese cooking. Both cuisines focus on simplicity, umami flavors, and local ingredients.

The menu draws from chef Watanabe's family background and personal history. His father is Japanese, his mother French-Canadian and Corsican. He grew up around South American and Mexican cuisine, which inform his present style. He worked as a sushi chef for ten years, and has experience at Italian and French restaurants. Watanabe described the process of developing dishes for Kissa Tanto as "an intuitive thing ... we're not trying to force it."

The produce and meat are locally sourced and sustainable. Fish and meat are brought in whole and butchered in-house, so less common cuts like pork loin, pork belly, and fish collar are often available as daily specials. Dressings, pickled vegetables, garnishes, and sourdough bread are made in-house. The sourdough bread is served with nori butter and olive oil.

Many dishes incorporate traditional Japanese ingredients like kombu (edible kelp), miso (fermented soybean paste), and katsuobushi (shaved smoked skipjack tuna) into traditional Italian dishes such as lasagna and tajarin. Others, such as the Japanese croquettes (korokke) and chawanmushi, incorporate Italian touches like parmesan cheese. The restaurant does not abide by strict rules for creating its fused dishes, according to Watanabe: "Sometimes dishes tend to feel more Italian and sometimes more Japanese. It’s very rare that it’s right in the middle". Alexandra Gill of The Globe and Mail found that many dishes, such as the chilled vegetable platter, "speak fervently to Vancouver." Discussing the reception of the cross-cultural menu, Watanabe said "We’ve had a lot of compliments from Italians," and "Japanese people think it’s odd, but they love it."

The fried fish has been singled out by reviewers as the restaurant's signature dish. It consists of a whole fish or large cut like fish collar, scored in a diamond pattern, battered in potato or rice flour and flash fried. It is served with grated-daikon soy sauce for dipping. Gill noted the rarity of seeing whole fish served in Vancouver, and lauded the kitchen for having the confidence to present the dish that way.

== Reception ==
Canada's 100 Best Restaurants ranking
Year	Rank	Change
2017	14	new
2018	10	▲4
2019	16	▼6
2020	12	▲4
2021	No List	
2022	29	▼17
2023	10	▲19
2024	10	Steady
2025	18	▼8
2026	15	▲3

Kissa Tanto has been placed on numerous best-of lists since its debut, including several lists of best new restaurants. In 2016, it was number one on EnRoute magazine's list of the top ten new Canadian restaurants. Alexandra Gill placed it on top of her 2016 list of the ten best new restaurants in Vancouver. Vancouver Magazine has awarded it "Best New Design" (2017) and "Best Pan-Asian" (2017, 2019). On the 2017 list Canada's 100 Best Restaurants, it was named best new restaurant. From 2017 to 2020, Kissa Tanto was ranked within the top 20 of the Canada's 100 Best list, at 14th (2017), 10th (2018), 16th (2019), 12th (2020), respectively. (Note: 2017; 2018; 2019; 2020) There was no list for 2021 due to the impact of the COVID-19 pandemic in Canada, and in 2022 it was placed 29th. Kissa Tanto was one of eight Vancouver restaurants to be awarded a Michelin star in 2022, the first year that the city was included in the Michelin Guide. Following this, one reviewer noted that it was "possibly Vancouver’s toughest reservation."

=== Design ===
Critics have highlighted Kissa Tanto's glamorous, dreamlike atmosphere, which seems to transport diners into a place out of fantasy. Canada's 100 Best called it a "charmingly eccentric, genre-defying hideaway". Pete Wells wrote that the design "conjures an imaginary parallel world". Vancouver Magazine described it as "a vision so romantic, so complete, it could be a film set". The review in EnRoute also evoked film: "suddenly I’m starring in a film noir with Italian-Japanese subtitles." Writing for ChefsFeed, Mallory Farrugia said that entering the restaurant is "as if you’ve crossed over into a Murakami novel". Reviewers have noted that diners tend to respond to its fanciful aesthetic in kind. Lindsay Anderson of Bon Appétit described Kissa Tanto as "an occasion worth dressing up for". Wells wrote that during his visit, "Everybody seemed to have gotten dolled up just for the fun of it." In Condé Nast Traveler, Guy Saddy wrote "Much like the room itself, the patrons here are dressed for dinner—in a hip, never formal, way."

=== Cuisine ===
The unusual combination of Italian and Japanese cuisine has been positively received by critics and diners alike. Particular attention has been given to Watanabe for finding common ground between the apparently disparate cuisines of Italy and Japan. EnRoute magazine stated, "Watanabe proves that Italy and Japan are natural bedfellows, married by a shared love of noodles, mushrooms and umami." For the Vancouver Sun, Mia Stainsby said that the combination was "a route on which [Watanabe] could drive off a cliff without a sixth sense about balance and harmony." The review in Monocle stated "It’s testament to Watanabe’s finesse that ingredients and techniques from two different cultures can come together seamlessly and, indeed, enhance the best aspects of each other." Farrugia described the food as maximalist, highlighting the abundance of distinct and intriguing textures across the menu. "The food of Kissa Tanto," she wrote, "signals a burgeoning desire for fiercer creativity, conviction, and volume; for, well, more." Hadani Ditmars of Wallpaper magazine called it "as subtly layered as the design".

== See also ==
- List of restaurants in Vancouver
- List of Michelin-starred restaurants in Vancouver
- Naporitan, a Japanese pasta dish based on Italian spaghetti
- Yōshoku, a Western-influenced style of Japanese cooking
