= David Hawksworth =

David Hawksworth may refer to:

- David Hawksworth, chef of Hawksworth Restaurant in Vancouver, Canada
- David Leslie Hawksworth (born 1946), British mycologist and lichenologist
