= Sushi Hil =

Japanese restaurant in Vancouver, British Columbia, Canada

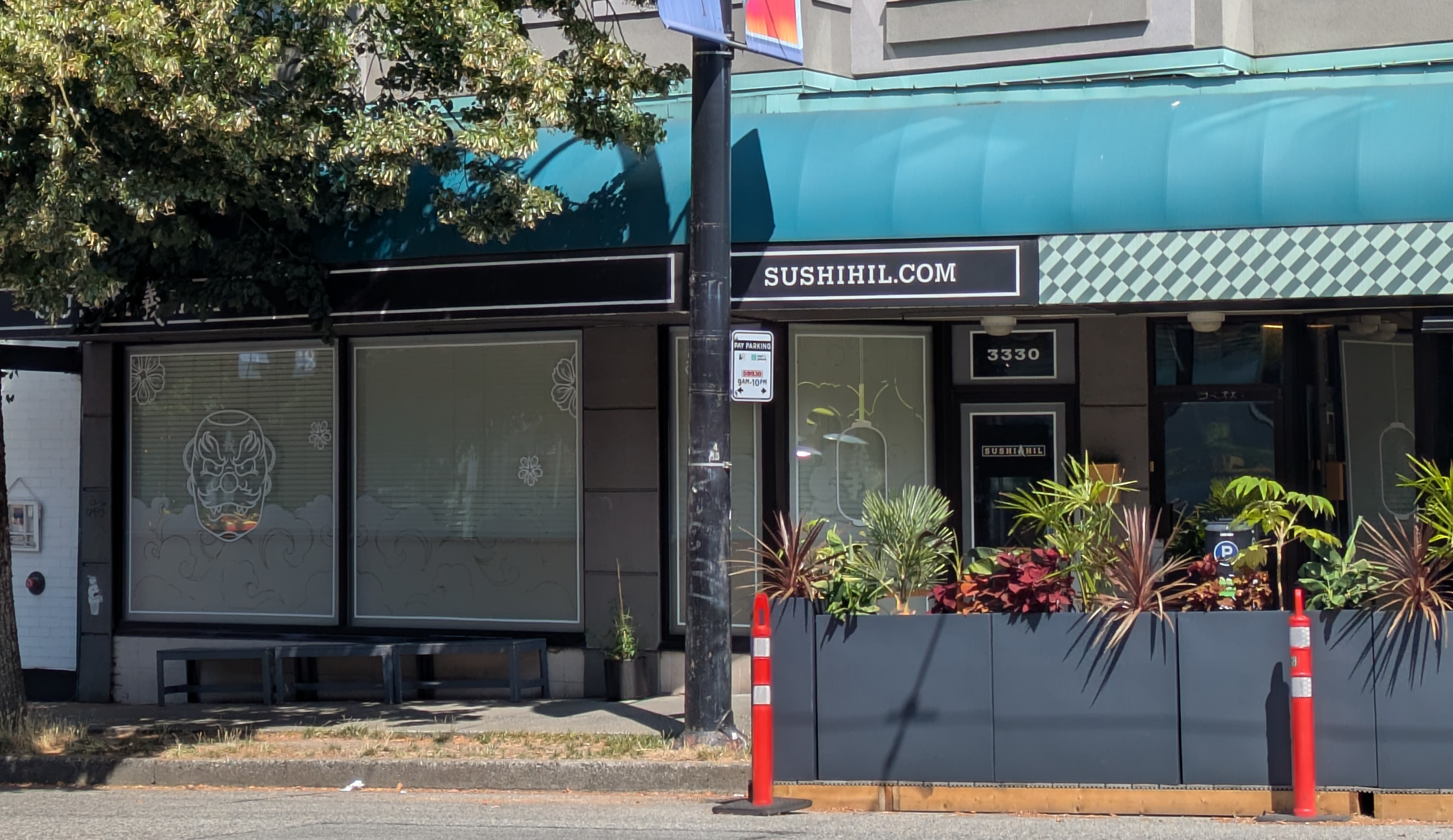
- The restaurant's exterior in 2025
- Interactive map of Sushi Hil

Restaurant information
- Established: August 15, 2022
- Food type: Japanese
- Location: 3330 Main Street, Vancouver, British Columbia, Canada
- Coordinates: 49°15′19.3″N 123°6′3.9″W
- Website: sushihil.com

Sushi Hil is a Japanese restaurant in Vancouver, British Columbia, Canada. The restaurant opened in 2022. It was a finalist in the Best New Restaurant and Best Japanese categories of Vancouver Magazine's 2023 restaurant awards.

== Canada's 100 Best Restaurants Ranking ==
Sushi Hil
Year	Rank	Change
2024	90	new
2025	▼ No Rank	

== See also ==
- List of Japanese restaurants
- List of Michelin Bib Gourmand restaurants in Canada
- List of restaurants in Vancouver
