= Falconetti's East Side Grill =

- Interactive map of Falconetti's East Side Grill

Restaurant information
- Location: 1812 Commercial Drive, Vancouver, British Columbia, Canada
- Coordinates: 49.2685°N 123.0694°W
- Other information: Featured on Diners, Drive-Ins and Dives

Falconetti's East Side Grill was a diner in Vancouver, British Columbia, Canada. It was featured on the Food Network series Diners, Drive-Ins and Dives. The business operated as a butcher shop and a bar. The second floor had a patio. The menu included sausage and beer. Falconetti's operated in the building that previously housed Monty's Pool Hall and Grandview Billiards.

== See also ==
- List of diners
- List of Diners, Drive-Ins and Dives episodes
- List of restaurants in Vancouver
