= George Wainborn Park =

Park in Vancouver, British Columbia, Canada

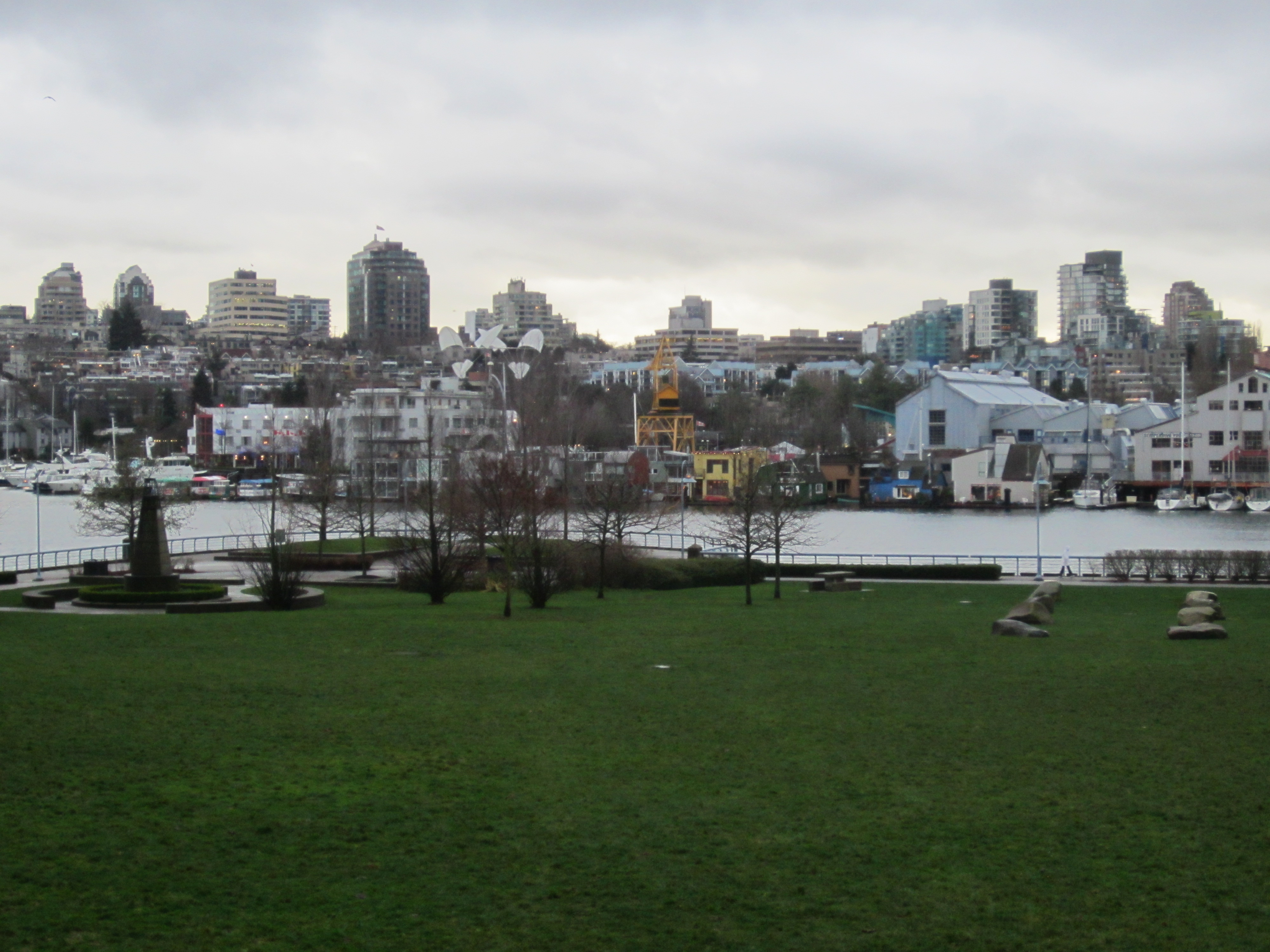
- The park and the Fairview neighbourhood, 2012
- Interactive map of George Wainborn Park
- Location: Vancouver, British Columbia, Canada
- Coordinates: 49.2724°N 123.1294°W
- Area: 2.5 hectares (6.2 acres)
- Opened: 2004

George Wainborn Park is a 2.5-hectare park along False Creek, located in downtown Vancouver, British Columbia, Canada. The park is facing Granville Island.

It was opened in 2004 and named after George Wainborn, who served as Vancouver's Parks Commissioner for 33 years.

The site of park was once home to Robertson Hackett Sawmill Company Limited since late 19th Century.

Ron Baird's Spirit Catchers statue stood here for duration of Expo 86 next to Great Ramses Exhibit and McBarge before being relocated to Barrie, Ontario.
