= Elisa (restaurant) =

Steakhouse in Vancouver, British Columbia, Canada

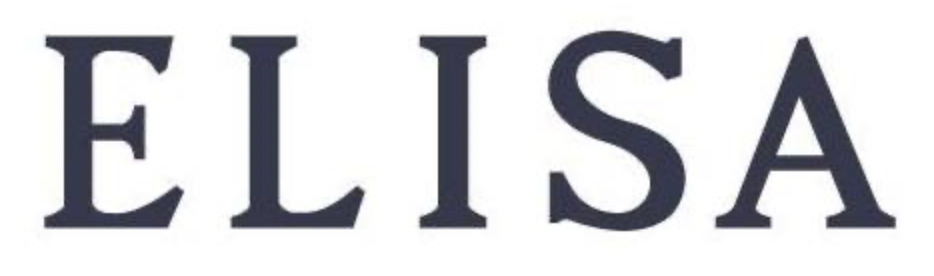
- Interactive map of Elisa

Restaurant information
- Established: 2018
- Owner: Toptable Group
- Food type: North American; seafood
- Location: 1109 Hamilton Street, Vancouver, British Columbia, V6B 5P6, Canada
- Coordinates: 49°16′33.5″N 123°7′17″W
- Website: elisasteak.com

Elisa is a steakhouse in Yaletown, Vancouver, British Columbia, Canada. Toptable Group opened the restaurant in 2018.

Elisa has garnered a positive reception, earning a reputation as one of Yaletown's best restaurants and the city's best steakhouses. It has received Best of Award of Excellence from Wine Spectator, and Franco Michienzi was named Sommelier of the Year by Vancouver Magazine in 2023. Elisa also became a recommended restaurant in the Michelin Guide in 2023.

== Description ==
Elisa is a farm-to-table steakhouse with a "contemporary" ambiance in Vancouver's Yaletown neighborhood, specializing in seafood and steak. The 6,800-square-foot restaurant uses a Grillworks Infierno wood-fired grill, and the interior has hostess and wine decanting stations, ceiling millwork, veneer wall panels, and a wine cellar. The menu has included truffle-roasted chicken, spring rolls with Dungeness crab, bison tartare, wagyu, beef Wellington, and coniglio brasato. Among cocktails on the drink menu is the Charring the Cosmos.

== History ==
Toptable Group opened the restaurant in 2018, in the space previously occupied by Milestones Grill and Bar. Andrew Richardson is the executive chef. Franco Michienzi has overseen the restaurant's wine program. Bartender Katie Ingram was part of the opening team. The interior was designed by New York's Rockwell Group, and woodwork was done by Acorn Wood Designs.

Like many restaurants, Elisa closed temporarily during the COVID-19 pandemic. In 2021, the restaurant was closed temporarily by Vancouver Coastal Health because of a communicable disease. Among celebrities who have dined at the restaurant are Skylar Astin, John Cena, Wayne Gretzky, and Keegan-Michael Key.

The team behind Elisa opened the butcher shop Luigi & Sons in 2022. Luigi & Sons offers cuts of meat from Elisa's menu.

== Reception ==
In 2019, The Globe and Mail said the restaurant is "worthy of a splurge night", as well as: "Elisa looks an awful lot like an alpha male strutting his stuff. It is not the most welcoming restaurant in the Toptable Group." Vancouver Magazine gave Elisa honourable mention in the Best New Restaurant category of the 30th Annual Restaurant Awards. The magazine's Neal McLenan included the Holstein striploin in a 2021 "COVID takeout honour roll", described as "a greatest hits of pandemic-era takeout". Vancouver Magazine awarded Elisa silver status (second place) in the Best Steakhouses category in 2022, and said the restaurant has a "trendy, modern vibe and vast selection of steaks and tartares". Franco Michienzi was named the magazine's Sommelier of the Year in 2023. Elisa also received a Best of Award of Excellence from Wine Spectator.

Noms Magazine has included Elisa in overviews of the best restaurants in Yaletown and Downtown Vancouver, as well as lists of the city's best fine-dining establishments, most romantic restaurants, and best steakhouses. The Daily Hive's Hanna McLean included Elisa in a 2020 overview of Vancouver's fourteen best outdoor dining restaurants. Amir Ali included Elisa in a 2021 list of 21 restaurants in the city "that will make you feel like a celebrity", and the website included the Tomahawk steak in a 2022 overview of twelve "lavish menu items in and around Vancouver worth splurging on". The Daily Hive also included Elisa in a 2023 overview of Yaletown's best patios. The business was added to the Michelin Guide as a "recommended" restaurant in 2023.

=== Canada's 100 Best Restaurants Ranking ===
Elisa
Year	Rank	Change
2020	76	new
2021	No List	
2022	▼ No Rank	
2023	▼ No Rank	
2024	▼ No Rank	
2025	87	▲ re-entry
2026	▼ No Rank	

== See also ==
- List of restaurants in Vancouver
- List of steakhouses
