= Anh and Chi =

Vietnamese restaurant in Vancouver, British Columbia, Canada

- Interactive map of Anh and Chi

Restaurant information
- Established: 1994
- Owners: The Nguyen Family (Amelie Nguyen, Ly Nguyen, and Vincent Nguyen)
- Previous owner: Hoang Nguyen
- Head chef: Ly Nguyen
- Food type: Vietnamese
- Location: 3388 Main St, Vancouver, British Columbia, V5V 3M7, Canada
- Coordinates: 49.2551603°N 123.103928°W
- Website: anhandchi.com

Anh and Chi is a Vietnamese restaurant in Vancouver, British Columbia, Canada. It has received Bib Gourmand status. Previously known and founded as Pho Hoang until 2016, the restaurant is currently owned by three known members of the Nguyen family: Executive chef Ly Nguyen, Amelie Nguyen and Vincent Nguyen. The name of the restaurant means "Brother and Sister" in Vietnamese.

== History ==
In 1994, Hoang Van Nguyen founded the restaurant, originally called, Pho Hoang. Nguyen and his wife Ly, were both refugees of the Vietnam War and founded the restaurant to "remember and honour" their homeland while establishing their new life in Canada and to emphasize "understanding and appreciating [Vietnamese] culture".

In 2010, Hoang Nguyen died due to liver failure. Nguyen's wife Ly, daughter Amelie, and son Vincent continued to operate the restaurant for a few years, but it "struggled to keep the restaurant afloat..." to the point where the Nguyen family had to "either close the restaurant or transform it".

In April 2016, addressed the struggles by renaming the restaurant into, what is today, Anh and Chi, "moderniz[ing] the room" and "revamp[ing] the menu".

In December 2020, the restaurant participated in the United Nations High Commissioner for Refugees' Reservation By Donation program: a fundraising initiative to help Ukrainian refugees.

== Reception ==
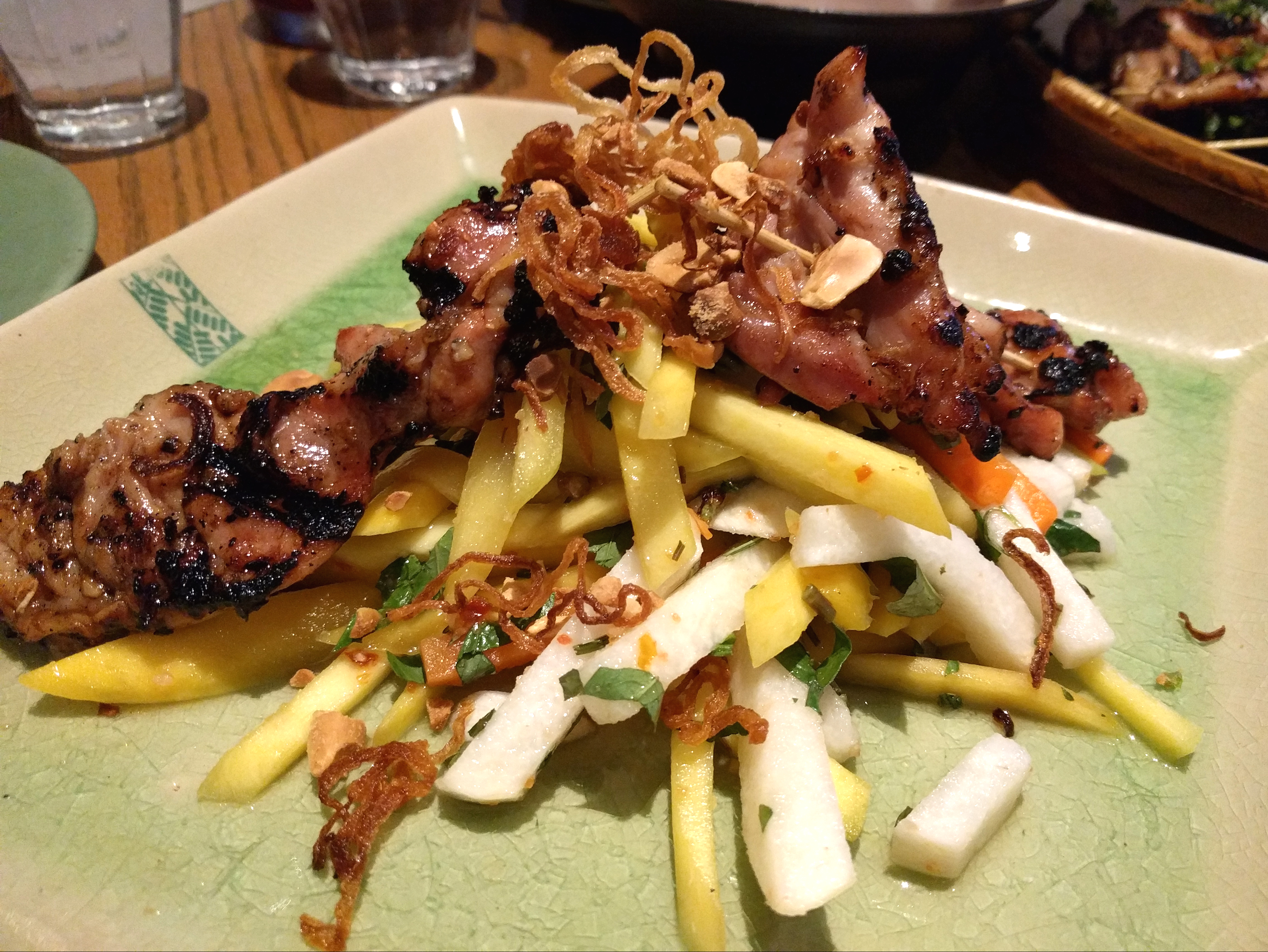
Gỏi Xoài: A salad, served at the restaurant, containing chicken, mango, shallots, peanuts, mint, mixed herbs, and tamarind (2017)

In 2006, the restaurant was selected as the Vancouver Sun's "Best Restaurants" for Pho. It was voted as The Province's "Top New Restaurant for 2016". In 2017, the restaurant received the Bronze Award for Vancouver Magazine's Best Vietnamese and won the Georgia Straight's Best Vietnamese award. The restaurant's gender-neutral washroom was one of the five finalists selected for Cintas' Canada's Best Restroom award in 2018 due to its "iconic Martinique wallpaper mirroring Vietnam's lush jungles". In 2020, the restaurant received the "People's Choice Award" from the Chef' Table Society of British Columbia. In 2024, the restaurant received Honorable Mention for Vancouver International Wine Festival's (VIWF) Wine Program Excellence Awards for "producing an original and creative wine program".

== See also ==
- List of Michelin Bib Gourmand restaurants in Canada
- List of restaurants in Vancouver
- List of Vietnamese restaurants
