= Sun Sui Wah =

Cantonese restaurant

Restaurant information
- Food type: Cantonese
- Location: Canada
- Other locations: Vancouver; British Columbia; Richmond

Sun Sui Wah (新瑞华) is a Cantonese restaurant with locations located in Vancouver, British Columbia and Richmond, British Columbia known for its dim sum and roasted squab. It was the first restaurant in Vancouver to offer live Alaskan king crab in the mid-1980s.

== See also ==
- List of restaurants in Vancouver
