= Chupito =

Mexican restaurant in Vancouver, British Columbia, Canada

Restaurant information
- Food type: Mexican
- Location: Vancouver, Canada

Chupito is a Mexican restaurant in Vancouver, British Columbia, Canada. It opened in 2021.

== See also ==
- List of Mexican restaurants
- List of Michelin Bib Gourmand restaurants in Canada
- List of restaurants in Vancouver
