= Seaport City Seafood =

Restaurant in Vancouver, British Columbia, Canada

Seaport City Seafood Restaurant
- Interactive map of Seaport City Seafood Restaurant

Restaurant information
- Food type: Chinese
- Rating: Bib Gourmand (Michelin Guide)
- Location: 2425 Cambie St, Vancouver, British Columbia, V5Z 4M5, Canada
- Coordinates: 49°15′50″N 123°6′55″W
- Reservations: Yes
- Sister Restaurant: The Deluxe Chinese Restaurant (Richmond)
- Website: https://seaportcityrestaurant.com

Seaport City Seafood is a Chinese restaurant in Vancouver, British Columbia, Canada.

== See also ==
- List of Chinese restaurants
- List of Michelin Bib Gourmand restaurants in Canada
- List of restaurants in Vancouver
