= Kavita (restaurant) =

Indian restaurant in Vancouver, British Columbia, Canada

- Interactive map of Kavita

Restaurant information
- Owner: Tushar Tondvalkar
- Food type: Indian
- Rating: Michelin Bib Gourmand
- Location: 250 W 3rd Ave, Vancouver, British Columbia, V5Y 1G1, Canada
- Coordinates: 49.2683°N 123.1102°W
- Seating capacity: 46
- Website: restaurantkavita.com

Kavita is an Indian restaurant in Vancouver, British Columbia, Canada.

== See also ==
- List of Indian restaurants
- List of Michelin Bib Gourmand restaurants in Canada
- List of restaurants in Vancouver
