= Tetsu Sushi Bar =

Restaurant in Vancouver, British Columbia, Canada

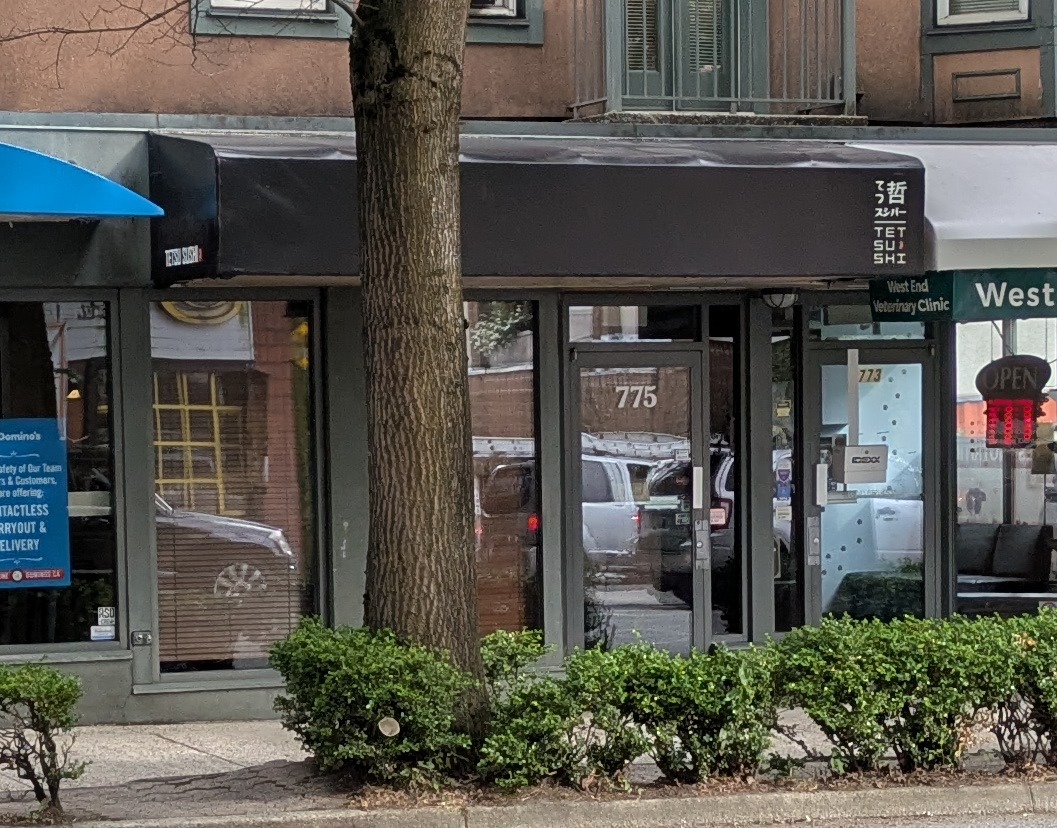
- The restaurant's exterior in 2025
- Interactive map of Tetsu Sushi Bar

Restaurant information
- Food type: Japanese
- Location: Vancouver, British Columbia, Canada
- Coordinates: 49°17′30.6″N 123°8′6.6″W

Tetsu Sushi Bar is a Japanese restaurant in Vancouver, British Columbia, Canada.

== See also ==
- List of Japanese restaurants
- List of restaurants in Vancouver
