= Gary's =

French restaurant in Vancouver, British Columbia, Canada

Gary's' is a French restaurant in Vancouver, British Columbia, Canada. Mathew Bishop is the chef.

== See also ==
- List of French restaurants
- List of Michelin Bib Gourmand restaurants in Canada
- List of restaurants in Vancouver
