= Lumière (restaurant) =

- Interactive map of Lumière

Restaurant information
- Established: November 1995; 30 years ago
- Head chef: Rob Feenie
- Food type: French, Canadian, North American
- Location: 2551 West Broadway, Vancouver, British Columbia, V6K 2E9, Canada
- Reservations: Not required, but recommended

Lumière was a restaurant on West Broadway in the Kitsilano neighbourhood of Vancouver, Canada. It was founded by Rob Feenie and Ken Wai in 1995. Feenie was the owner and chef until 2007, when he left the restaurant after a falling-out with his business partners, at which time he was replaced by Dale MacKay as head chef.

== Honours ==
=== Designation ===
- Zagat 2006 - July 2, 2006

- Most Popular Restaurant, Vancouver
- AAA - 2005, 2006
- 5 Diamond Award

- Mobile Travel Guide - 2005, 2004, 2003, 2002, 2001

- 4 Stars

- Traditions et Qualitè - 2004
- Relais & Châteaux - 2000

- Relais Gourmands

=== Awards ===
- Best Restaurant 2006 - April 27, 2006

- Vancouver Sun, Best Restaurant Overall Award 2006 Mia Stainsby, Food Critic

- Vancouver Magazine - 2005, 2004, 2003, 2002, 2001, 2000, 1999, 1998, 1997

- Critic's Poll Gold Award for Best French Restaurant

- Iron Chef America - 2005

- Champion of "Battle Crab"

- DiRona - 2004, 2003, 2002, 2001

- Award of Excellence

- Gold Medal Plates - 2004

- Voter’s Favorite- Gold Medal Dish

- Vancouver Magazine - 2003, 2002, 2001, 2000, 1999, 1998, 1997

- Critic’s Poll Gol Award for Restaurant of the Year

- Vancouver Magazine - 2003

- Critic’s Poll - Chef of the Year

- Vancouver Magazine - 2000, 2001

- Critic's Poll Gold Award for Best Vegetarian

- Vancouver Magazine - 2000

- Critic's Poll Gold Award Best use of Regional Ingredients

- Vancouver International Wine Festival - 1999
  Andrew Quady Dessert Competition
- Gourmet Magazine - 1999

- America's Top Table Reader's Poll - Top Food in Vancouver

- Food Service and Hospitality Magazine - 1998

- Pinnacle Award Canadian Restaurant of the Year

- Vancouver Restaurant Association - 1995

- Media Choice for Best New Restaurant

== See also ==
- List of restaurants in Vancouver
