= Motonobu Udon =

Japanese restaurant in Vancouver, British Columbia, Canada

- Interactive map of Motonobu Udon

Restaurant information
- Food type: Japanese
- Location: 3501 East Hastings Street, Vancouver, British Columbia, Canada
- Coordinates: 49°16′52.6″N 123°1′41″W

Motonobu Udon is a Japanese restaurant in Vancouver, British Columbia, Canada. The restaurant opened in East Vancouver in 2020.

== See also ==
- List of Japanese restaurants
- List of Michelin Bib Gourmand restaurants in Canada
- List of restaurants in Vancouver
