= Japadog =

Restaurant chain in British Columbia, Canada

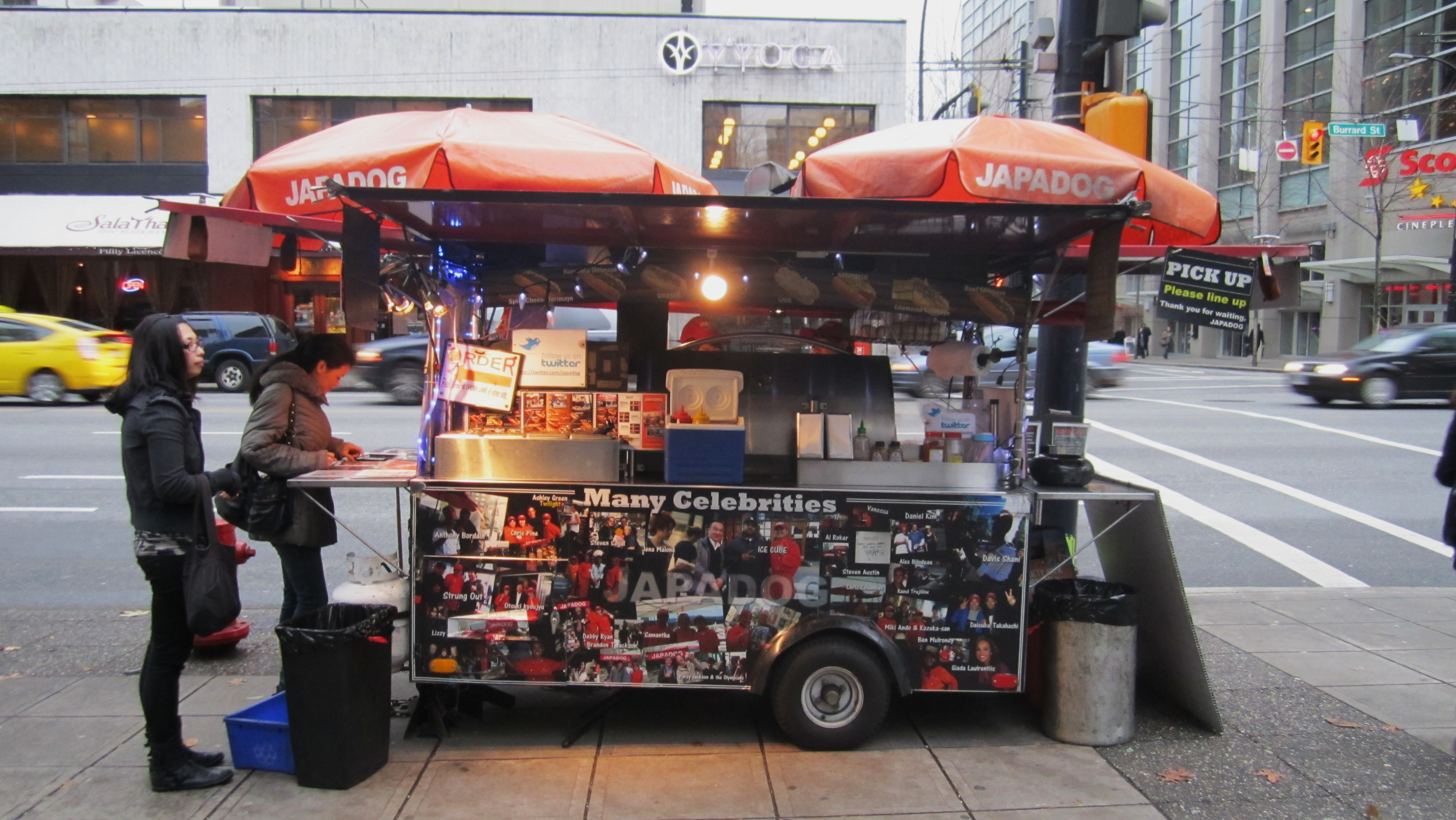
Japadog's first stand located on Burrard St, Vancouver

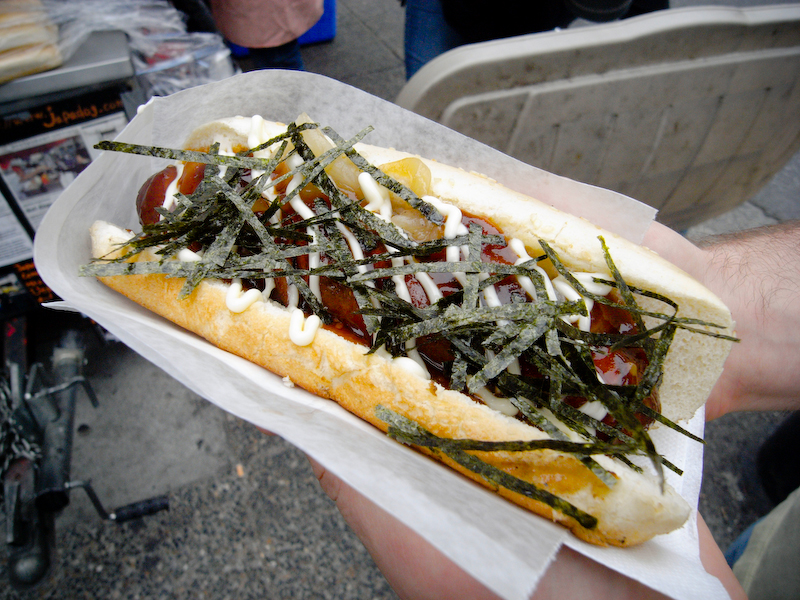
A "Terimayo" hot dog from Japadog.

Japadog is a small chain of street food stands and restaurants originating in Vancouver, Canada. The chain, which specializes in hot dogs that include variants of Japanese-style foods like okonomiyaki, yakisoba, teriyaki and tonkatsu, is owned by Noriki Tamura.

== History ==
Tamura and his wife moved to Vancouver in 2005. They opened the first Japadog stand that same year. A second stand opened in Vancouver in the summer of 2009. In 2010, they expanded beyond their three mobile stands in Vancouver, opening a sit-in restaurant, allowing them to serve extra items such as desserts and their unique french fries, called "shaked fries." The kitchen staff prepare them by placing the cooked fries in a paper bag and seasoning and shaking them until coated. They also have a trailer location on the pier in Santa Monica, California.

== Locations ==
As of September 2025, Japadog has stores and trailers in the following locations:

=== Metro Vancouver, Canada ===
- 530 Robson St, Vancouver, BC – store
- 899 Burrard St, Vancouver,BC – trailer (Japadog's first location)
- The Amazing Brentwood, Burnaby,BC – store
- McarthurGlen Outlet Mall, Richmond, BC – store
- YVR Domestic Terminal (interior, before security), Richmond,BC – store
- Metrotown Station, Burnaby, BC – Food Truck

=== Toronto, Canada ===
509 Young St, Toronto, ON – store

The Well, 486 Front St W, Toronto, ON – store

Square One, 100 City Centre Dr, Mississaga, ON – store

=== Santa Monica, US ===
- 200 Santa Monica Pier – trailer

== See also ==
- List of restaurants in Vancouver
