= Fountainhead Pub =

Gay bar and restaurant in Canada

Coordinates: 49.2797°N 123.1296°W

- Interactive map of Fountainhead Pub

Restaurant information
- Established: 2000; 26 years ago
- Location: Vancouver, British Columbia, Canada
- Website: thefountainheadpub.com

The Fountainhead Pub is a gay bar in Vancouver's West End, in British Columbia, Canada.

== Description ==
Fodor's says, "With one of the largest street-side patios on Davie Street, you can do as the locals do here: sit back, down a few beers, and watch the beautiful people pass by." Frommer's rates the bar 2 out of 3 stars. The website's Joanne Sasvari wrote, "Reflecting the graying and mellowing of Vancouver's boomer-age gay crowd, one of the hottest hangouts these days is this relaxed pub that offers excellent microbrews on tap, decent food, and a pleasant atmosphere until the morning's wee hours."

NewNowNext says, "The décor isn’t what you'd choose – unless you were determined to recreate a rural hotel bar from the mid-70s – but the Fountainhead remains the gay neighborhood pub of choice for everyone from baby dykes to teetering drag queens to the gay rugby team. More televisions that you can count screen competing shows as Top 40 hits play on the stereo. It's packed, noisy, welcoming and has the best people-watching patio in the Village."

== History ==
A man was the victim of a gay-bashing incident at the bar in 2009. The bar launched the "To Russia With Love" campaign in 2014. Justin Trudeau visited the bar in 2019. According to PinkNews, he was the "first Canadian head of government to make an official visit to a gay bar".

Anthony "Scotty" Larin, who managed the bar and was a community organizer, died in 2020. Plans for expansion were approved in 2022.

== See also ==
- List of LGBTQ bars
- List of restaurants in Vancouver
