= Fiorino (restaurant) =

Italian restaurant in Vancouver, British Columbia, Canada

- Interactive map of Fiorino

Restaurant information
- Food type: Italian
- Location: Vancouver, British Columbia, Canada
- Coordinates: 49.2784°N 123.0992°W

Fiorino is an Italian restaurant in Vancouver, British Columbia, Canada. It has received Bib Gourmand status.

== See also ==
- List of Italian restaurants
- List of Michelin Bib Gourmand restaurants in Canada
- List of restaurants in Vancouver
