= Moltaqa =

Restaurant in Vancouver, British Columbia, Canada

- Interactive map of Moltaqa

Restaurant information
- Food type: Moroccan
- Location: Vancouver, British Columbia, Canada
- Coordinates: 49°16′35.2″N 123°7′8.6″W
- Website: https://moltaqarestaurant.ca/

Moltaqa is a Moroccan restaurant in Vancouver, British Columbia, Canada.

== See also ==
- List of restaurants in Vancouver
