= Lunch Lady (restaurant) =

Vietnamese restaurant in Vancouver, British Columbia, Canada

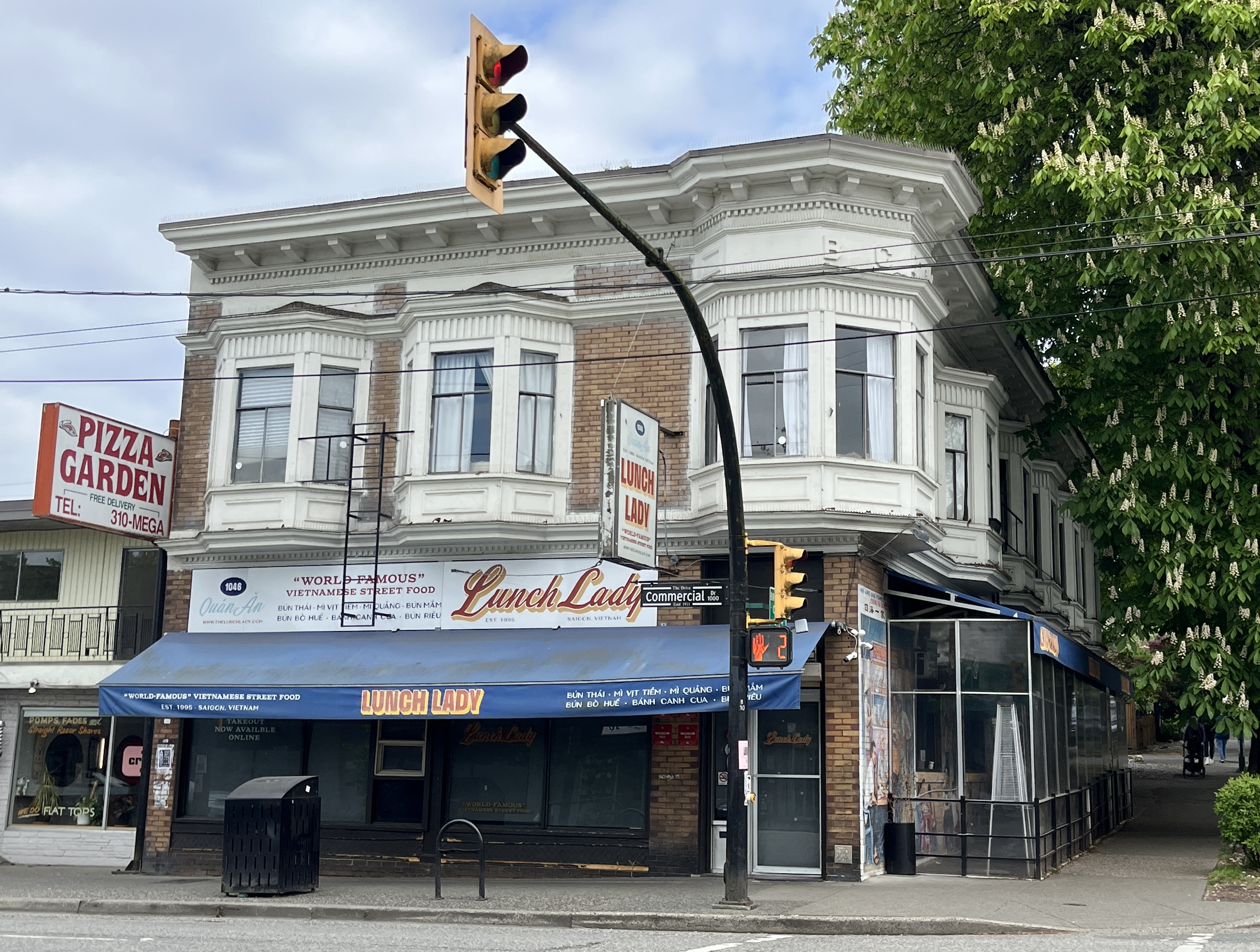
- Lunch Lady, as seen from across Commercial Drive
- Interactive map of Lunch Lady

Restaurant information
- Food type: Vietnamese
- Location: 1046 Commercial Drive, Vancouver, British Columbia, Canada
- Coordinates: 49.2749°N 123.0693°W
- Website: thelunchlady.com

Lunch Lady is a Vietnamese restaurant in Vancouver, British Columbia, Canada. It has received Bib Gourmand status.

== See also ==
- List of Michelin Bib Gourmand restaurants in Canada
- List of restaurants in Vancouver
- List of Vietnamese restaurants
