= List of restaurants in Vancouver =

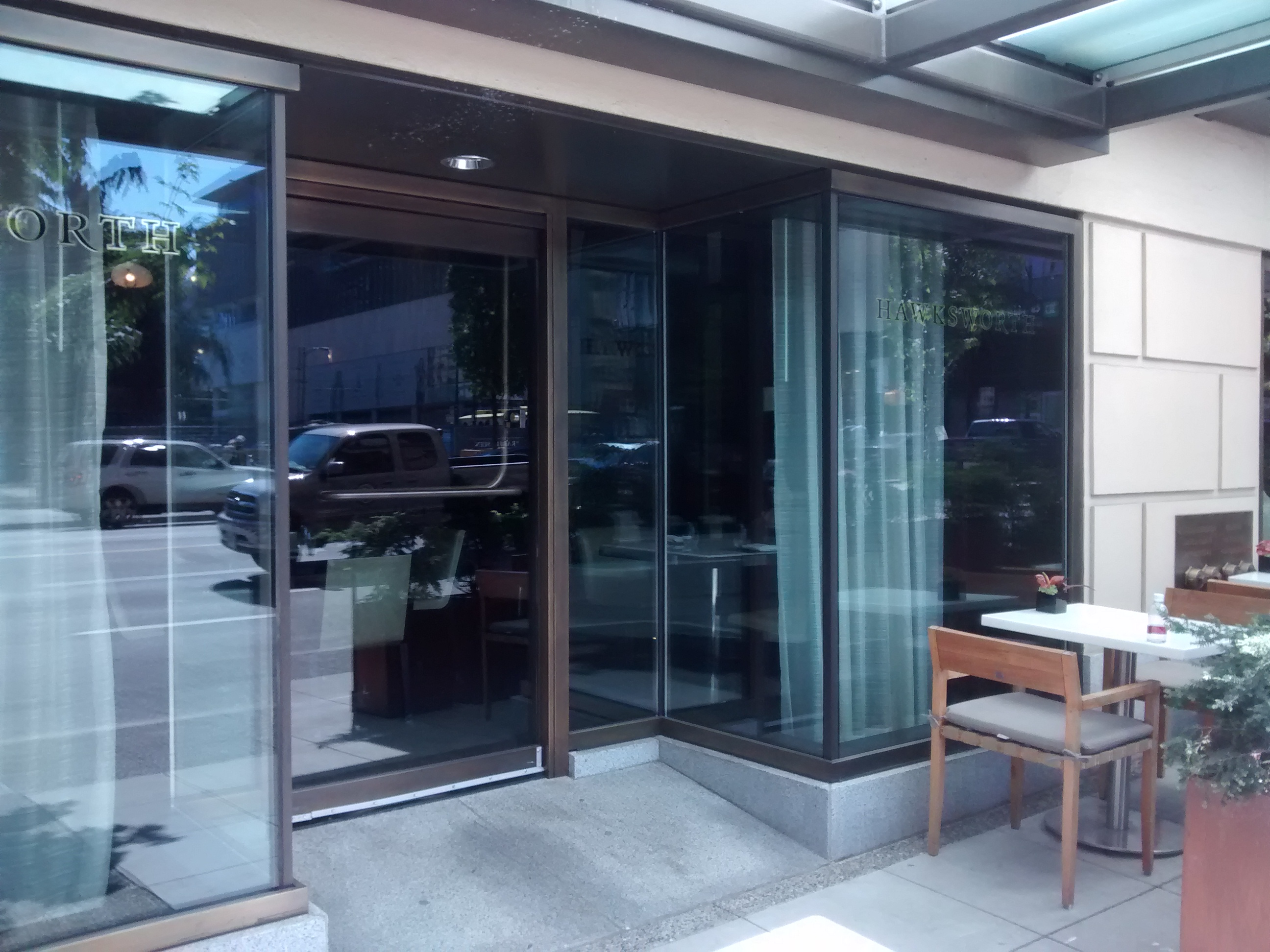
Hawksworth Restaurant

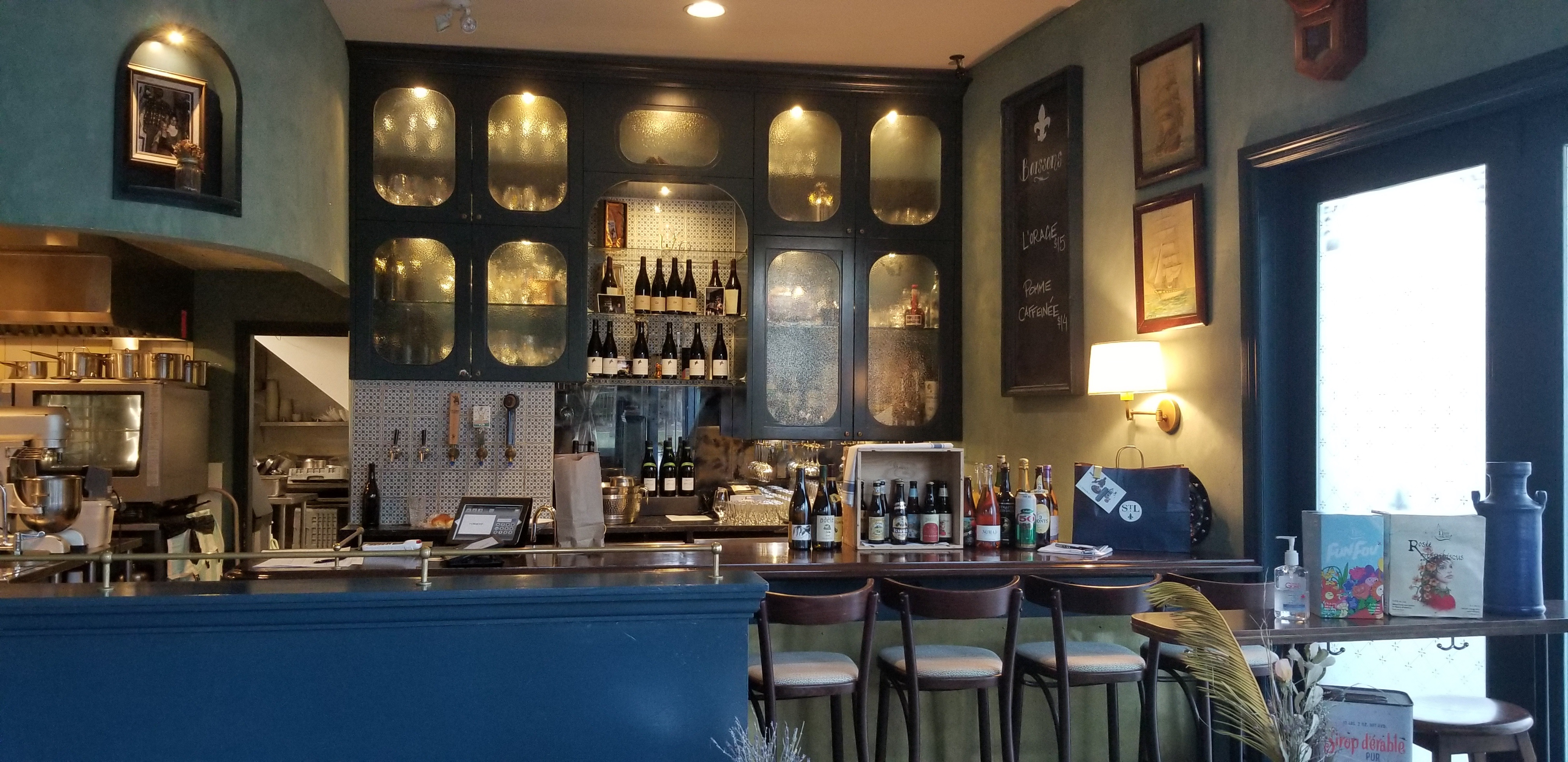
St. Lawrence

This is a list of notable restaurants in Vancouver, British Columbia, Canada.

== Restaurants ==
- Afuri
- Anh and Chi
- AnnaLena
- The Attic
- Barbara
- Boulevard Kitchen & Oyster Bar
- Burdock & Co
- Cactus Club Cafe
- Chef's Choice Seafood
- Chupito
- Chung Chun Rice Dog
- Elisa
- Fable Kitchen
- Farmer's Apprentice
- Feenie's
- Fiorino
- Fountainhead Pub
- Gary's
- Good Thief
- Hawksworth Restaurant
- iDen & QuanJuDe Beijing Duck House
- Japadog
- Joey
- Karma Indian Bistro
- Kavita
- Kissa Tanto
- Liliget Feast House
- Lumière
- Lunch Lady
- Masayoshi
- McBarge
- Moltaqa
- Motonobu Udon
- Nightshade
- The Old Spaghetti Factory
- Okeya Kyujiro
- Ovaltine Cafe
- Phnom Penh
- Published on Main
- Ramen Danbo
- Salmon n' Bannock
- Seaport City Seafood
- St. Lawrence
- Sumibiyaki Arashi
- Sun Sui Wah
- Sushi Hil
- Sushi Hyun
- Sushi Masuda
- Tetsu Sushi Bar
- Vij's
- Virtuous Pie
- White Spot
- Wildlight Kitchen + Bar

== See also ==
- Pacific Northwest cuisine
