= Nightshade (Vancouver restaurant) =

Restaurant in Vancouver, British Columbia, Canada

- Interactive map of Nightshade

Restaurant information
- Established: December 1, 2021
- Closed: September 12, 2023
- Head chef: Chanthy Yen
- Location: 1079 Mainland Street, Vancouver, Canada
- Coordinates: 49.2759°N 123.1203°W

Nightshade was a restaurant in Vancouver, British Columbia, Canada. Chanthy Yen was the head chef. The restaurant closed in September 2023 to re-locate, though it has not re-opened as of August 2024.

== Description ==
The Financial Times has said the restaurant offers "sophisticated" vegan fine-dining food. The menu includes street corn eloté, a tempura crunch sushi roll, an empanada with Filipino bolognaise, eggplant and maitake rendang, and jerk mushroom wellington.

== Reception ==
Nightshade has received Bib Gourmand status.

== See also ==
- List of Michelin Bib Gourmand restaurants in Canada
- List of restaurants in Vancouver
