= Karma Indian Bistro =

Indian restaurant in Vancouver, British Columbia, Canada

- Interactive map of Karma Indian Bistro

Restaurant information
- Food type: Indian
- Location: Vancouver, British Columbia, Canada
- Coordinates: 49°16′6.6″N 123°10′1.7″W
- Website: karmaindianbistro.ca

Karma Indian Bistro is an Indian restaurant in Vancouver, British Columbia, Canada. It has received Michelin Bib Gourmand status.

== Description ==
The Indian restaurant Karma Indian Bistro operates on West 4th Avenue in Vancouver's Kitsilano neighborhood. The Chicken 65 has south Indian fried-style chicken, jackfruit tikka, methi paneer, butter chicken, coconut rice pudding, and chocolate lava cake. The drink menu includes a Chai Negroni.

== History ==
The restaurant opened in 2022.

== Reception ==
The restaurant has received Michelin Bib Gourmand status; the guide says, "The chef's serious vision is outlined on a menu of wonderfully delicious traditional dishes interspersed with bold, innovative plates." Katy Brennan of the Daily Hive wrote, "From classic curries to tandoori dishes, there's a wide variety of food to explore. All dishes blend locally sourced ingredients with authentic Indian spices to create an explosion of flavour."

== See also ==
- List of Indian restaurants
- List of Michelin Bib Gourmand restaurants in Canada
- List of restaurants in Vancouver
