= Good Thief (restaurant) =

Vietnamese restaurant in Vancouver, British Columbia, Canada

- Interactive map of Good Thief

Restaurant information
- Owner: Amelie Nguyen (Co-founder)
- Food type: Vietnamese
- Location: Vancouver, British Columbia, Canada
- Coordinates: 49.2553°N 123.101°W

Good Thief is a Vietnamese restaurant in Vancouver, British Columbia, Canada.

== History ==
Amelie Nguyen is a co-founder.

== Reception ==
Good Thief received honourable mention in Vancouver Magazine's list of best new restaurants in 2025.

== See also ==
- List of Michelin Bib Gourmand restaurants in Canada
