= Phnom Penh (restaurant) =

Asian restaurant in Vancouver, British Columbia, Canada

- Interactive map of Phnom Penh

Restaurant information
- Food type: Cambodian; Vietnamese
- Location: 244 E Georgia St, Vancouver, British Columbia, V6A 1Z7, Canada
- Coordinates: 49.2784°N 123.0982°W
- Website: phnompenhrestaurant.ca

Phnom Penh is a restaurant located in Vancouver, British Columbia, Canada. It serves Vietnamese and Cambodian cuisine. It has received Bib Gourmand status.

== See also ==
- List of Michelin Bib Gourmand restaurants in Canada
- List of restaurants in Vancouver
- List of Vietnamese restaurants
