= The Attic (restaurant) =

Former West Vancouver restaurant

Coordinates: 49°19′40″N 123°8′3.23″W

The Attic was a popular 1,200 seat Smörgåsbord restaurant in West Vancouver, British Columbia that was open from 1968 to 1981. The owners were former Vancouver alderman Frank Baker (1922–1989) and his wife Dorothy.

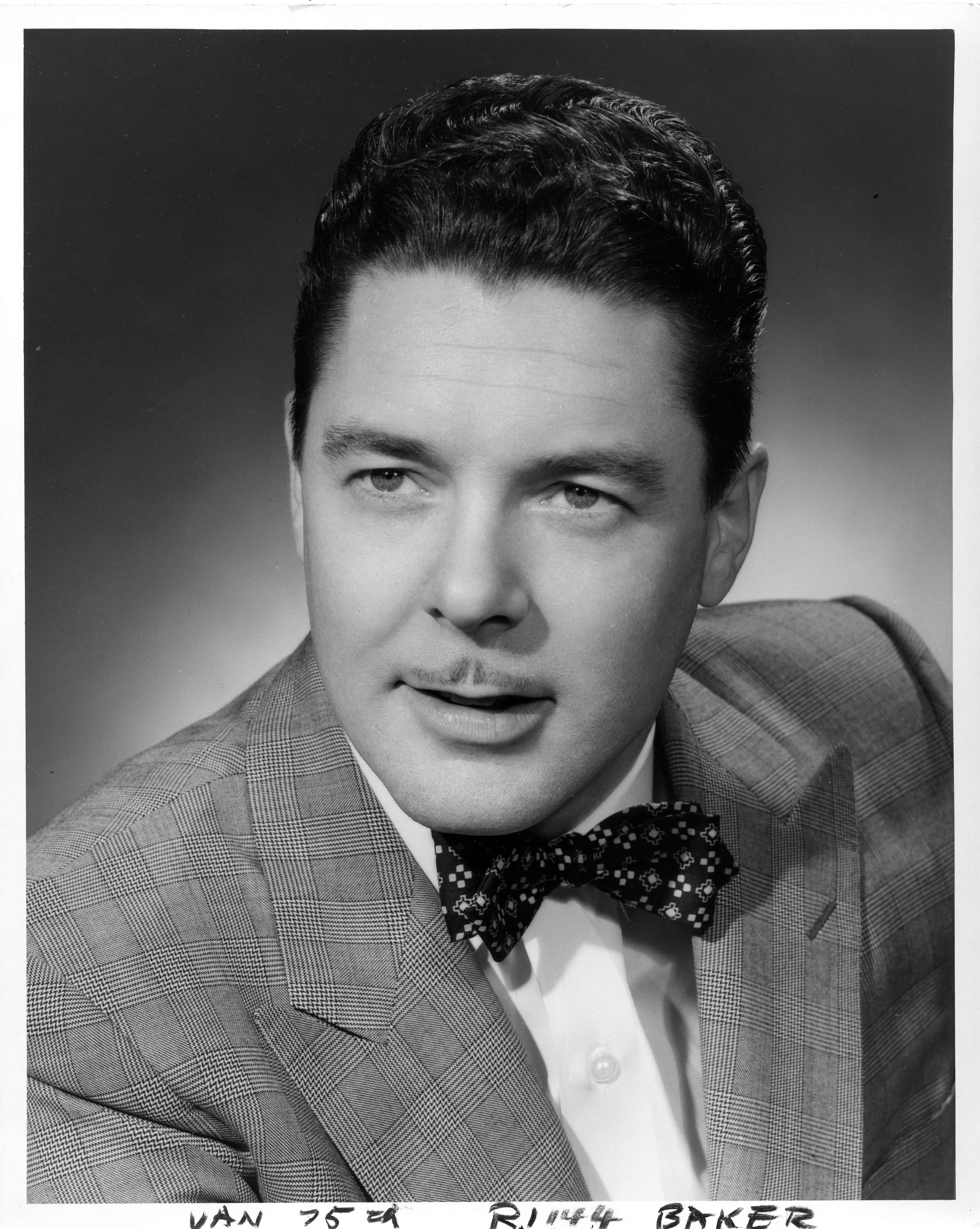
Head shot of Alderman Baker, the co-owner of The Attic, circa 1958.

== Unique features ==
The Attic is most remembered for a 1964 James Bond car in a glass case as well as a Toronado 67 X built by George Barris for Expo 67. Both cars were parked out front for public view and sold near the time of the restaurant's closing. For a brief time, the restaurant also displayed a psychedelic hand-painted Rolls Royce that had belonged to John Lennon.

There was a statue of David in the women's washroom. When the leaf was lifted on this statue, alarms would sound and/or lights would flash alerting other patrons and causing embarrassment to the person who lifted it.

Lance Harrison and the Dixieland Band entertained patrons, with Baker playing his trumpet on many occasions. He would also greet people at the door playing it. Baker also had a 12' by 6' weather vane mounted on the roof of him playing a trumpet.

Baker's was an avid collector of Tiffany lamps. His huge collection, said to be "over a hundred", were in use throughout the restaurant.

In 2005 it was inducted into the B.C. Restaurant Hall of Fame.

== See also ==
- List of restaurants in Vancouver
