= Chef's Choice Seafood =

Restaurant in Vancouver, British Columbia, Canada

Coordinates: 49.2636°N 123.1255°W

Chef's Choice Seafood is a Cantonese / Chinese restaurant in Vancouver, British Columbia, Canada. It operates on West Broadway. The restautant received Bib Gourmand status in the Michelin Guide in 2026. The menu includes deep-fried chicken, king crab, and Portuguese-style curried rice.

== See also ==
- List of Chinese restaurants
- List of Michelin Bib Gourmand restaurants in Canada
- List of restaurants in Vancouver
