= Fable Kitchen =

Restaurant in Vancouver, British Columbia, Canada

- Interactive map of Fable Kitchen

Restaurant information
- Established: 2012
- Manager: Nicolle Vaupotic
- Head chef: Michael Broadbent
- Food type: Modern Canadian; North American
- Location: 1944 West 4th Avenue, Vancouver, British Columbia, V6J 1M5, Canada
- Coordinates: 49.2678562°N 123.1490162°W
- Website: fablekitchen.ca

Fable Kitchen is a restaurant in Vancouver's Kitsilano neighbourhood, in British Columbia, Canada. It serves contemporary / Modern Canadian and North American cuisine. The interior has a chandelier made of pitchforks. Fable Kitchen has received Bib Gourmand status.

== See also ==
- List of Michelin Bib Gourmand restaurants in Canada
- List of restaurants in Vancouver
