= Boulevard Kitchen & Oyster Bar =

Restaurant in Vancouver, British Columbia, Canada

Coordinates: 49°16′59″N 123°7′26″W

- Interactive map of Boulevard Kitchen & Oyster Bar

Restaurant information
- Food type: Seafood
- Location: Vancouver, British Columbia,, Canada

Boulevard Kitchen & Oyster Bar is a seafood restaurant in Vancouver, British Columbia, Canada.

== Recognition ==
=== Canada's 100 Best Restaurants Ranking ===
Boulevard
Year	Rank	Change
2019	31	new
2020	24	▲7
2021	No List	
2022	9	▲15
2023	43	▼34
2024	22	▲21
2025	55	▼33

== See also ==
- List of restaurants in Vancouver
