= Sauce charcutière =

Compound French sauce

Charcutière sauce is a compound French sauce consisting of a base of Sauce Robert with a flavouring of chopped gherkins. Its literal translation is "sauce of the pork butcher". It is most frequently used with cuts of grilled or sautéed pork.
