= McBarge =

Defunct floating McDonald's restaurant in Vancouver

Coordinates: 49.184197°N 122.567424°W

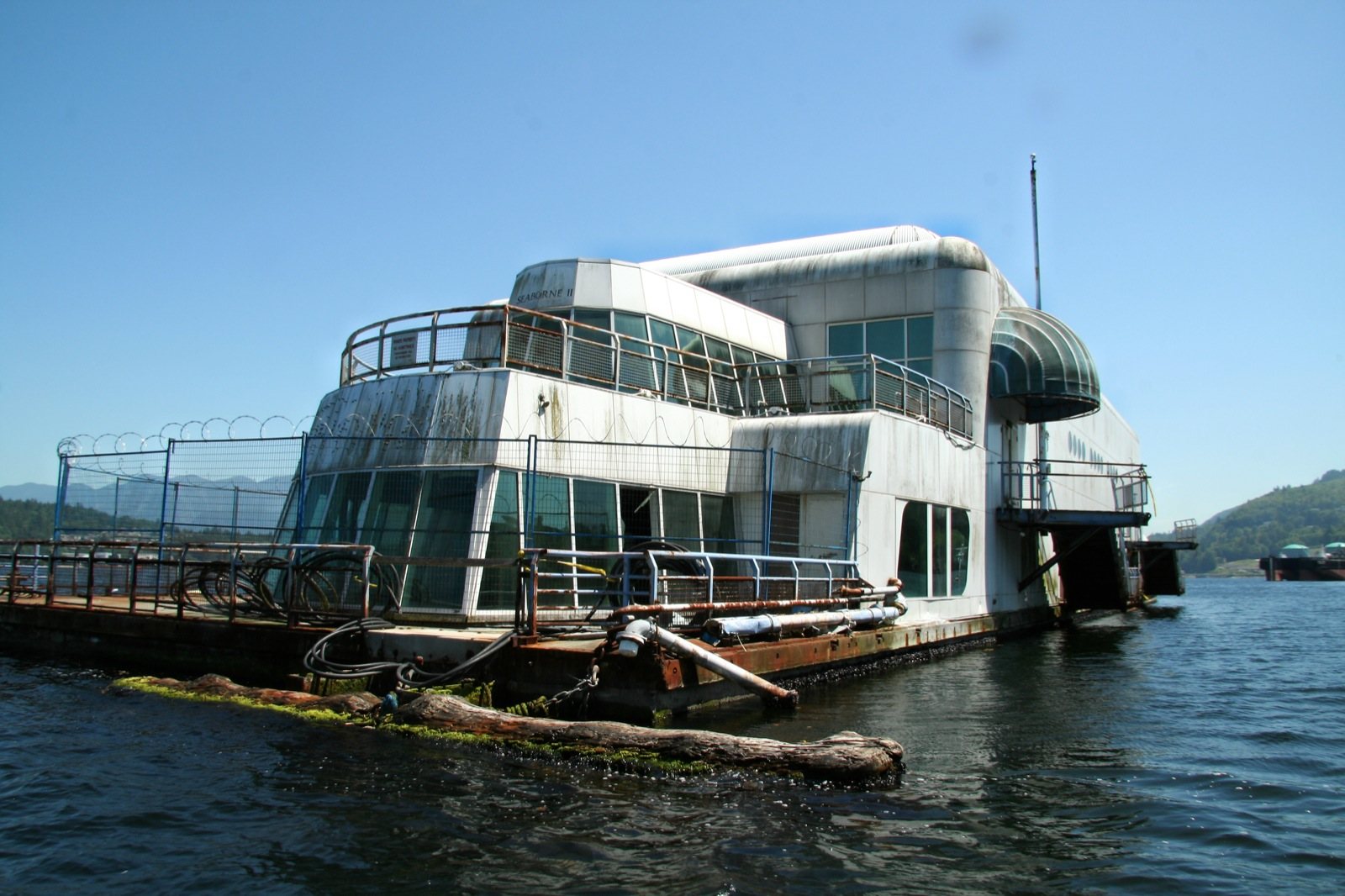
The McBarge anchored in Burrard Inlet near Vancouver, British Columbia, in 2006

The McBarge, officially named the Seaborne II (formerly the Friendship 500), was a former McDonald's restaurant, built on a 187-foot-long (57 m) barge for Expo 86 in Vancouver, British Columbia. Moored on Expo grounds in Vancouver's False Creek, it was the second floating McDonald's location in the world (the first being in St. Louis, Missouri), intended to showcase future technology and architecture. Although the floating design allowed for the barge to operate in a new location following the exhibition, the derelict McBarge was anchored empty in Burrard Inlet from 1991, amid industrial barges and an oil refinery, until it was moved in December 2015 to Maple Ridge, British Columbia. Apart from brief use as a McDonald's restaurant in 1986, the McBarge has never actively been used for anything and was drifting from owner to owner for 34 years. By the end of March 2025, the McBarge had capsized and partially sank into the Fraser River in Maple Ridge.

== History ==
The floating restaurant was designed by Robert Allan Ltd. for Expo 1986 and was one of five McDonald's locations on the Expo grounds, all of which were constructed for a total of $12 million. McDonald's originally intended to continue using it as a restaurant after Expo 86, but the barge remained empty at the Expo grounds until 1991, when the new owner of the grounds forced McDonald's to remove it. It was then anchored derelict in Burrard Inlet, north of Burnaby, British Columbia.

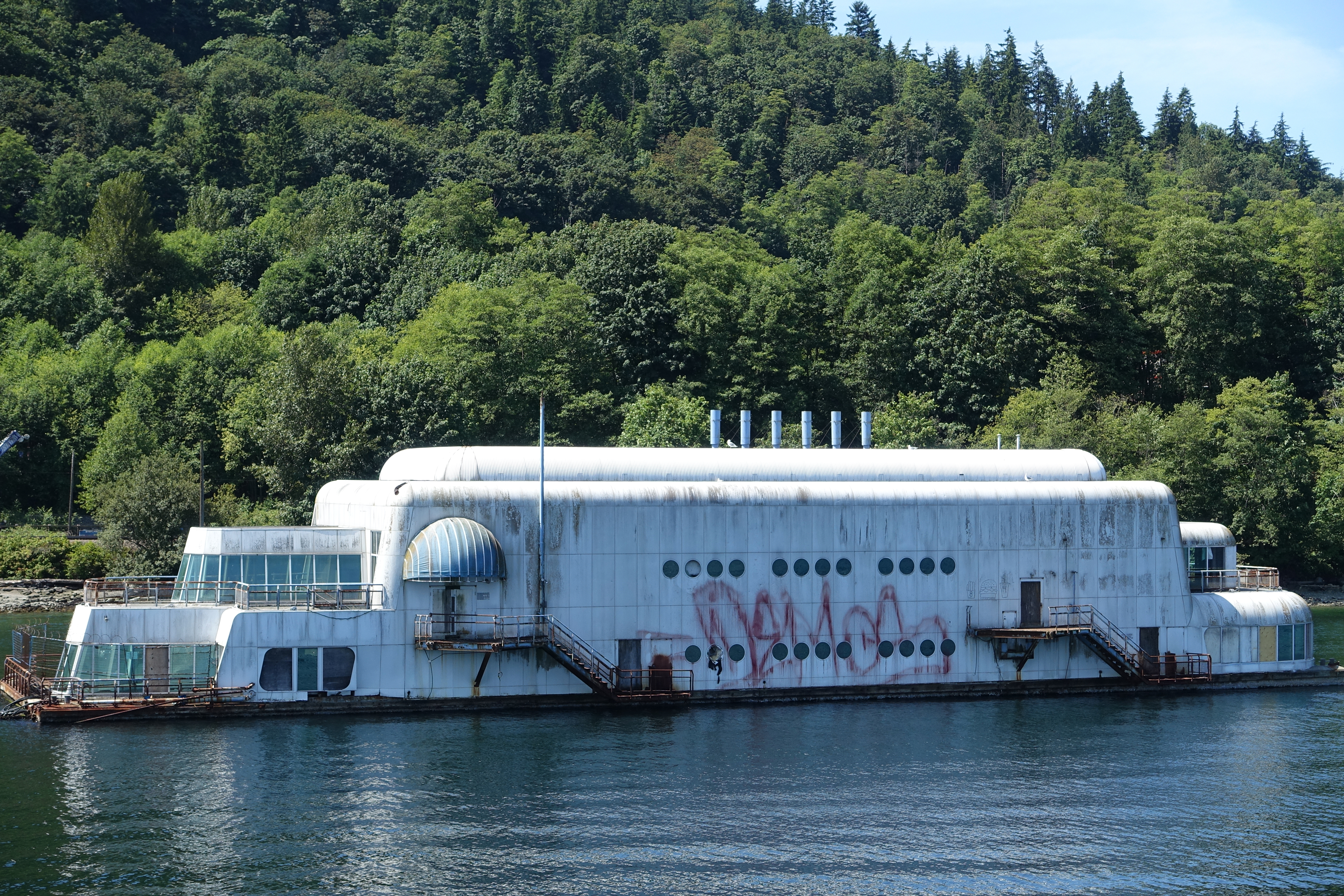
The ship anchored in Burrard Inlet in 2015

In 2003, Marvel Entertainment and New Line Cinema rented the barge as a filming location for the 2004 film Blade: Trinity. In June 2009, the McBarge's owner, Gastown developer Howard Meakin, submitted a proposal to the Mission city council for a waterfront development on the Fraser River, with the former McBarge as the centrepiece. Named "Sturgeon's on the Fraser", the development would include multiple restaurants and a marina complex, including paddlewheeler excursions and float plane service to Victoria and Nanaimo. Concerns over float plane noise and other environmental issues meant the development was ultimately rejected. Another proposal that had been put forward without owner interest included using the barge as a homeless shelter to alleviate overcrowding in Vancouver's temporary shelters.

In December 2015, Meakin announced that the barge would soon be leaving Burrard Inlet after nearly 30 years. It was moved to Maple Ridge, British Columbia on December 22. The barge was scheduled for a $4.5-million refit there before being relocated to an undisclosed location. In 2017, the barge's owners, alongside diving pioneer Phil Nuytten, announced plans to convert it into an attraction called the Deep Ocean Discovery Centre. An event was planned for 21 October 2017 to launch a crowdfunding campaign, but was cancelled due to weather concerns.

In 2020, it was reported that there were plans to refit the barge into a seafood restaurant, though a location had not been secured. Later in 2021 it was reported that an undisclosed site had been selected but was awaiting government approval. On March 26, 2025, it was reported that the McBarge had partially sunk into the Fraser River in Maple Ridge. Transport Canada was unable to locate the current owner at that time, because Meakin died in April 2025, shortly after the vessel capsized.

== See also ==
- List of restaurants in Vancouver
