= Wildlight Kitchen + Bar =

Restaurant in Vancouver, British Columbia, Canada

- Interactive map of Wildlight Kitchen + Bar

Restaurant information
- Location: Vancouver, British Columbia, Canada
- Coordinates: 49°15′57″N 123°14′13″W

Wildlight Kitchen + Bar is a restaurant in Vancouver, British Columbia, Canada.

== See also ==
- List of restaurants in Vancouver
