= Hawksworth Restaurant =

Restaurant in Vancouver, British Columbia

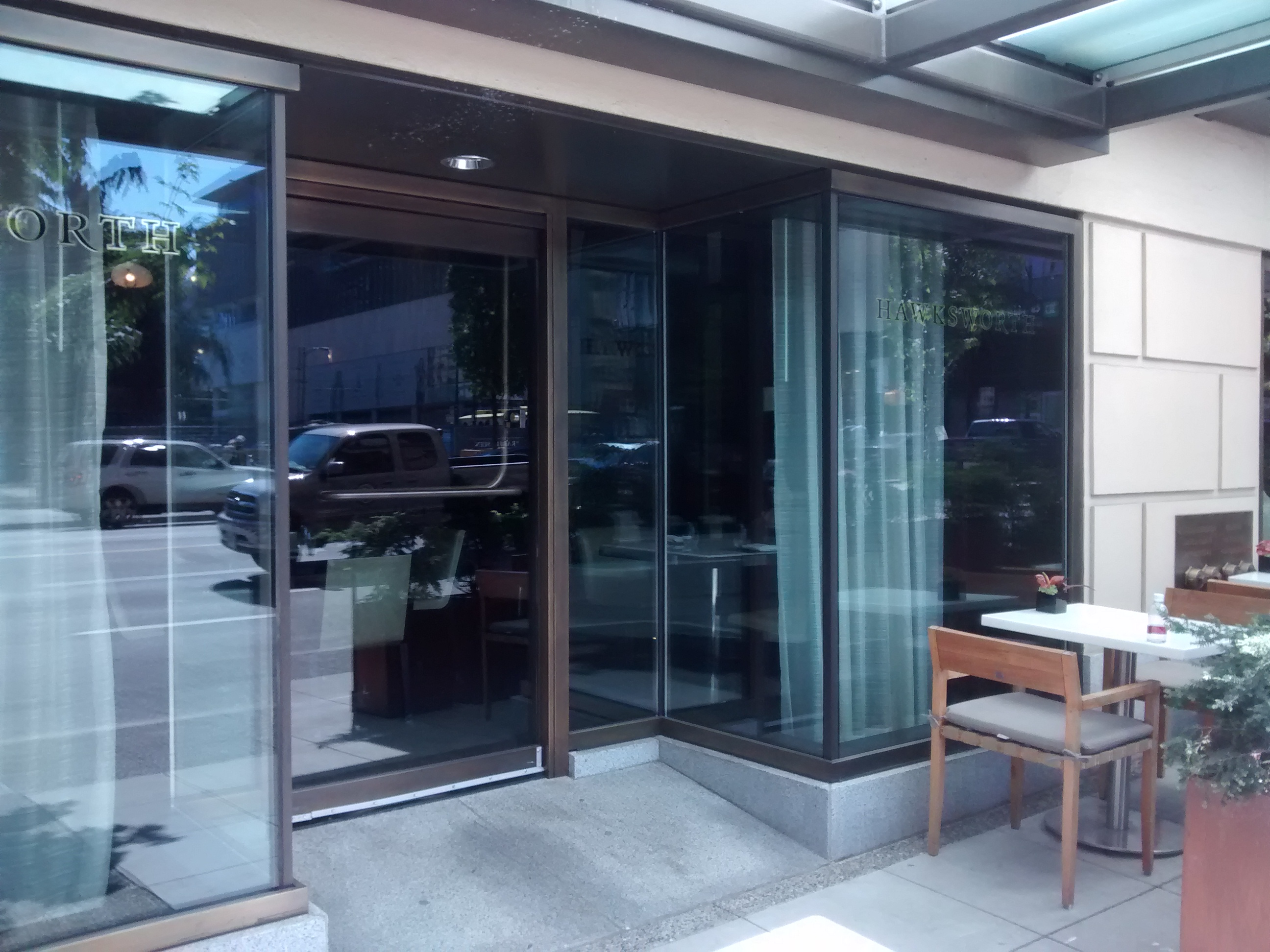
- Interactive map of Hawksworth Restaurant

Restaurant information
- Owner: David Hawksworth
- Chef: Sylvain Assie
- Food type: Contemporary Canadian
- Location: 801 West Georgia Street, Vancouver, Canada
- Coordinates: 49°17′00″N 123°07′09″W
- Phone: 604.673.7000
- Website: HawksworthRestaurant.com

Hawksworth Restaurant, located in the Rosewood Hotel Georgia in Vancouver, British Columbia, is a fine-dining restaurant owned by chef David Hawksworth, the youngest chef to be inducted into the B.C. Restaurant Hall of Fame. The restaurant was named, "Restaurant of the Year" in 2012 by Maclean's.

== Recognition ==
=== Canada's 100 Best Restaurants Ranking ===
Hawksworth Restaurant
Year	Rank	Change
2015	2	new
2016	3	▼1
2017	6	▼3
2018	11	▼5
2019	11	Steady
2020	19	▼8
2021	No List	
2022	25	▼6
2023	20	▲5
2024	67	▼47
2025	66	▲1
2026	▼ No Rank	

== See also ==
- List of restaurants in Vancouver
