= Vancouver Magazine =

Canadian magazine

- Editor-in-Chief: Stacey McLachlan
- Art Director: Stesha Ho
- VP of Content: Anicka Quin
- Readership: 137,500
- Categories: Lifestyle magazine
- Frequency: 8 yearly
- Circulation: 25,000
- Founded: 1967
- Company: Canada Wide Media Limited
- Country: Canada
- Based in: Vancouver
- Language: English
- Website: www.vanmag.com
- ISSN: 0380-9552

Vancouver Magazine is an English-language lifestyle magazine focused on Vancouver, British Columbia and the Lower Mainland. Vancouver Magazine describes its mission as helping readers discover the "experiences, people, and stories that make this city come alive." The main areas of coverage are restaurants, culture, city issues, real estate, drinking, fashion and travel.

Vancouver Magazine is published eight times a year, including the tourist-focused CityGuide annual. The magazine is owned by the Canada Wide Media, and shares an editorial staff with sister publication Western Living.

== History and profile ==
Founded in 1967, the magazine started its life as Dick McLean's Greater Vancouver Greeter Guide. In 1973 it became known as Vancouver's Leisure Magazine, when editor Mac Parry took over, though over the course of a few months it was retitled as simply Vancouver. Parry would go on to be editor for 16 years.

Yellow Pages acquired Vancouver Magazine and Western Living from Transcontinental in 2015. Canada Wide Mediaacquired the two publications from Yellow Pages in 2018, adding Vancouver Magazine and Western Living to a roster of publications that included BCBusiness and TV Week. Canada Wide Media was then acquired by Alive Publishing Group in 2023.

In 2012, it won Magazine of the Year, Western Canada, at the Western Magazine Awards. In 2016, it was nominated for Best Service and Lifestyle Magazine in Canada at the National Magazine Awards.

Vancouver Magazine is available for purchase from newsstands across British Columbia. However, since 2025, annual subscriptions have been free.
