= Mister Jiu's =

Chinese restaurant in San Francisco

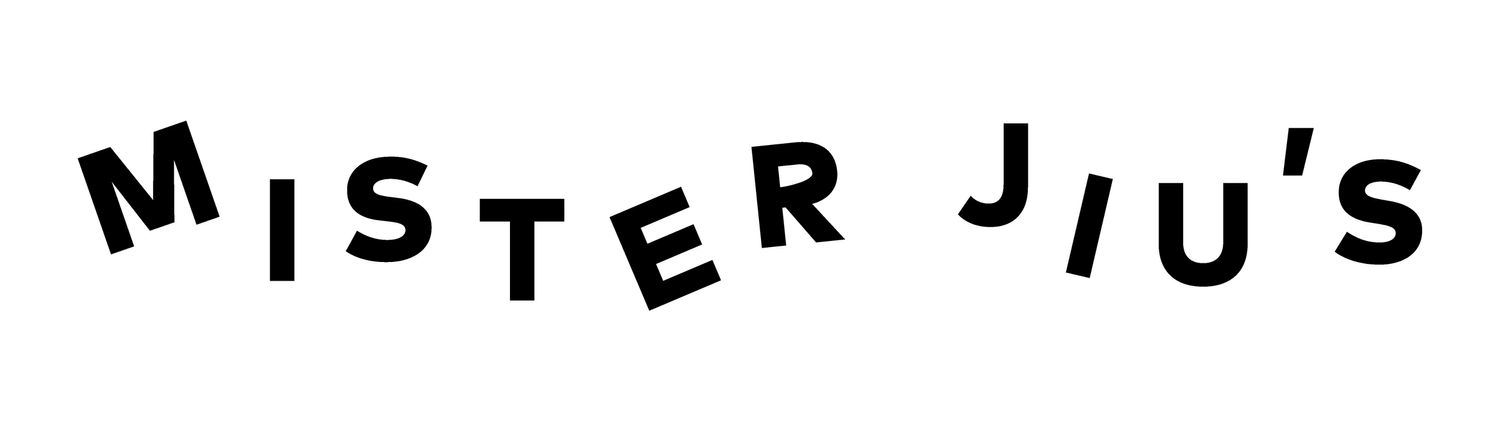

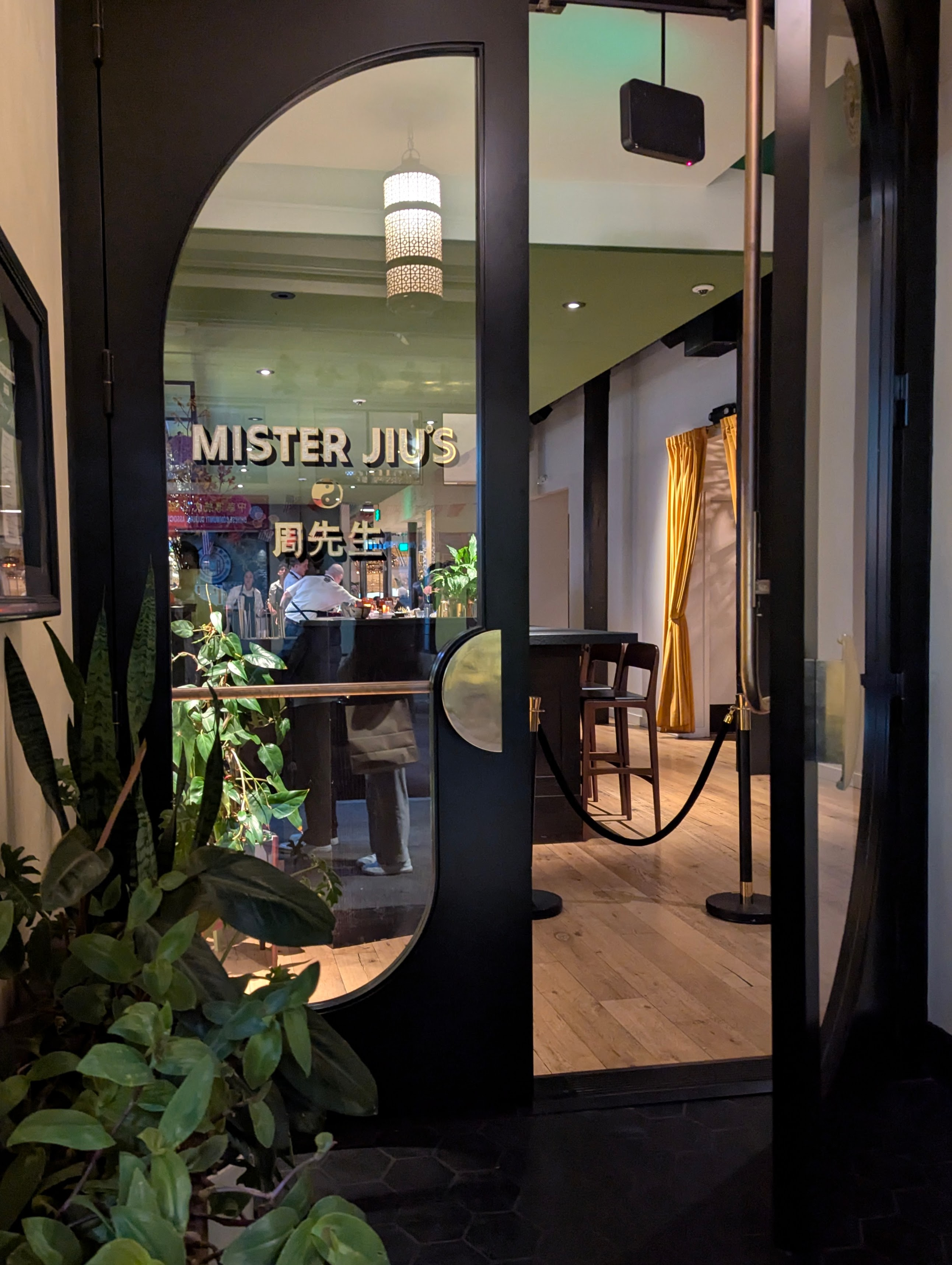
- Interactive map of Mister Jiu's

Restaurant information
- Established: April 2016
- Owners: Brandon Jew; Anna Lee
- Food type: Cantonese
- Rating: (2016–present)
- Location: 28 Waverly Place, Chinatown, San Francisco, San Francisco, California, 94108
- Coordinates: 37°47′37.46″N 122°24′24.08″W
- Website: misterjius.com

Mister Jiu's (Chinese: 周先生; pinyin: Zhōu xiānsheng) is a Michelin-starred Chinese restaurant in Chinatown, San Francisco. It specializes in Cantonese cuisine blended with modern Californian twists.

== Background ==
Before Mister Jiu's, the site was the previous location of Hang Far Low (杏花樓) and then the Four Seas Restaurant (四海酒樓). Hang Far Low was established in the 1880s and lasted decades. The Four Seas Restaurant was established soon after the $250,000 (equivalent to $2,721,000 in 2025) interior reconstruction in 1960. After lasting over five decades, the Four Seas Restaurant was shut down when its lease was ending in 2013. Meanwhile, a number of restaurants in Chinatown, including ones that could hold wedding receptions, had been declining. More restaurateurs shifted to the Avenues and the South Bay, more likely middle-class areas.

Brandon Jew (周英卓), a Chinese American, was born in a year of the Goat in San Francisco and raised in its Richmond District. While in college, in one restaurant, Jew initially worked as a busboy, then a food runner, and then a cook after substituting for an absent cook in one stint. He earned his bachelor's degree in biology in 2001.

Then Jew became a cook in Italy by apprenticeship in Piedmont and then Bologna. He learned Italian cuisine in the country. Jew then worked at three eateries in San Francisco, including Quince. Among the eateries, he worked at Zuni Café for two years, mentored by its head chef Judy Rodgers. He became a chef for Bar Agricole in 2010. Jew further studied Chinese cuisine in Shanghai.

The first floor of the building is a gift shop selling permanent magnets and plastic crickets.

== History ==
A chef, Brandon Jew leased the 10,000-ft^{2} four-storey property in 2013 and spent almost three years recruiting investors and renovating a century-old building to further comply with the city's building code. The building entrance was moved from 731 Grant Avenue to 28 Waverly Place. Barriers between the kitchen and the dining room in the Four Seas's second floor were demolished for the rooms to expose each other. His Kickstarter campaign, the final investing round, resulted in more than $67,000 (equivalent to $90,000 in 2025).

Mister Jiu's, named after Jew's surname but in Taishanese romanization, opened to the public on the weekend of April 8–10, 2016. When it debuted, among its original members were chef patron Brandon Jew, pastry chef Melissa Chou, sous chef Sara Hauman, and bar director Danny Louie. The restaurant's second floor has the 85-seat dining room and kitchen exposing each other in view. It also retains the Four Seas Restaurant's "gold lotus chandeliers and filigree lights [...] set against white walls, wood floors and midcentury-esque [sic] chairs and tables". Through the windows of the restaurant's second floor, nearby places and streets, the clock tower of the San Francisco Ferry Building, and high-rise buildings on Commercial Street can be seen. A neon green parklet was built outside the restaurant entrance for outdoor dining.

The restaurant's current owners are Brandon Jew and his wife Anna Lee. In 2023, for cost reasons, they changed the format of the restaurant from à la carte service to a five-course tasting menu. The change was reverted in 2025.

Numerous alumni have gone on to found successful projects. Melissa Chou of Grand Opening Bakery was a pastry chef. William Lim Do, the founder of Lao Wai Noodles, was a sous chef. Another alumnus Christina Marinucci became the founder of Marinucci's Pasta Shop. Armin Chan, the founder of Weirdough Focaccia, is a line cook. Chefs Franky Ho and Mike Long went on to start Four Kings a few blocks away on Commercial Street.

== Menu ==
The restaurant's menu has been seasonal. Jew's cooking was inspired by his deceased grandmother, whose Cantonese recipes he "master[ed] and record[ed]" and whose undocumented ones were lost. His recipes have combined traditional Cantonese cuisine with contemporary Californian twists. When it debuted, the restaurant served per person its $69 five-course menu—including "a lotus root salad", "a tureen of hot-and-sour fish soup with nasturtiums", "Shanghai rice cakes with leeks and kohlrabi", "steamed Alaskan halibut with young ginger", and "house-smoked oysters"—in addition to supplements, like "tea-smoked duck" and "black-sesame cake with rosebud mousse and strawberries".

Later in 2016, the menu included the following dishes: fried rice with beef tenderloin; beef tartare with jalapeños; rice noodle rolls filled with either lobster or uni; baby bok choy with "sauce, scallops. and prosciutto"; Steamed Alaskan Halibut; roasted quail with glutinous rice and cherries; Black Sesame Cake; Coconut Dessert, a rice cracker "with cherry sauce and coconut ice cream".

In August 2019, the menu included the following dishes: Dutch Crunch BBQ Pork Buns; Sourdough Scallion Pancake; Sea Urchin Cheong Fun, a sea urchin variant of rice noodle roll; Crispy Scarlet Turnip Cakes, served with olives and mushrooms; Taiwanese-Style Eggplant, served with basil and fish sauce; Silken Tofu, a mapo tofu variant; Potstickers; Salt-Baked McFarland Springs Trout, a trout wrapped in banana leaf and cooked in salt crust, served with scallion ginger sauce; Steak Fried Rice; Liberty Farms Roast Duck, a Peking duck variant "served with duck liver mousse and peanut butter hoisin" alongside bing bread with scallions and cucumbers.

With Tienlon Ho (何天蘭), Jew wrote a cookbook titled Mister Jiu's in Chinatown, released on March 9, 2021. In 2022, the book won a James Beard Award in the Restaurant and Professional category.

== Reception ==
Six months after the opening, the restaurant earned its first Michelin star in October 2016, becoming the first Chinese restaurant in San Francisco to do so, and has retained it since. As of December 2023, the restaurant remains the only Chinese restaurant in the United States with just one Michelin star. (Bistro Na's, a Chinese restaurant from southern California that also opened in 2016, previously had a Michelin star.)

Taylor Abrams of The Infatuation gave the restaurant 8.7 out of ten in 2016, praising its service and food. Bon Appétit magazine ranked it third in the 2017 top ten Best New Restaurants list. Will Kamensky of The Infatuation in 2019 praised its dining room setting and "impressive", "incredible" food.

After four visits in the restaurant's first two months, Michael Bauer of San Francisco Chronicle in June 2016 rated the restaurant, its food, and its service two and a half out of four stars each. Bauer rated its atmosphere setting three out of four. He noted chef patron Brandon Jew's "challenges in crafting a menu that successfully walks the line between tradition and innovation" and emphases on "tradition to focus his creativity". However, he initially criticized the execution, which he wrote "has incrementally improved" over time. Bauer praised Jew's steak tartare dish, "best" steamed Alaskan halibut dish, quail dish, and hot and sour soup, but he criticized other dishes, like fried rice as "sticky and gummy".

In 2022, Jew won a James Beard Award for Best Chef: California in relation to his work at Mister Jiu's.

== Moongate Lounge ==
Moongate Lounge
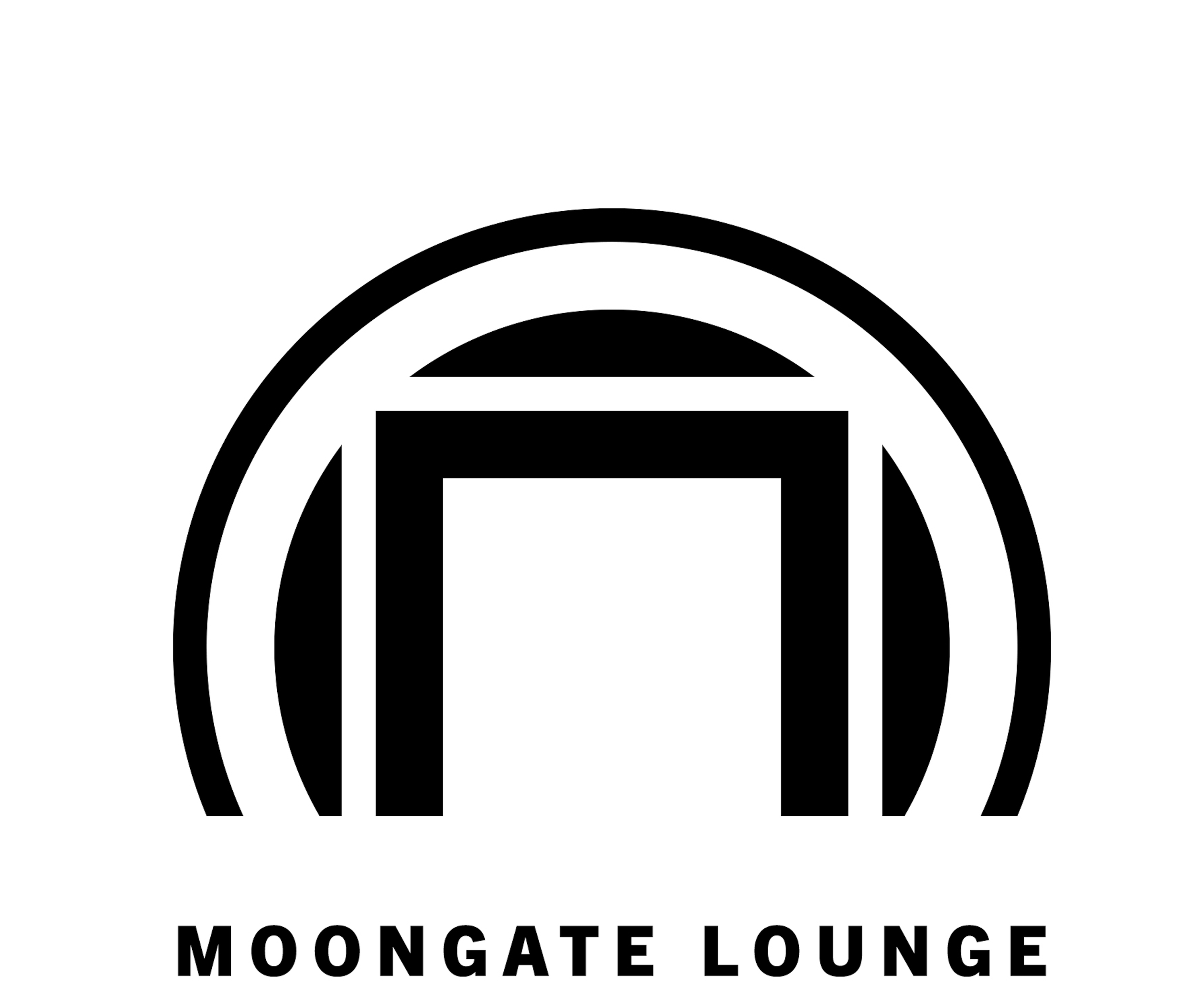

Restaurant information
- Established: March 2, 2019
- Owners: Brandon Jew; Anna Lee
- Food type: cocktail; alcoholic drinks; Chinese
- Location: 28 Waverly Place, San Francisco, San Francisco, California, 94108, United States
- Website: moongatelounge.com

The top floor of the building, formerly the Four Seas's third-floor 500-seat banquet room, was still under renovation at Mister Jiu's debut. Almost three years later, on March 2, 2019, owners Brandon Jew and Anna Lee, both also of the restaurant, established the place at the top floor as Moongate Lounge, a sister bar and lounge upstairs from the main restaurant. Moongate Lounge occupies one half of the building, i.e. 5,000-ft^{2} space, including high ceiling; Mister Jiu's occupies the other half.

The lounge's design, including arcs and "a Pantheon-esque oculus", was inspired by moon gates, circular openings of traditional Chinese architecture. One of "moon gate"-like designs was also inspired by artist James Turrell's works.

The lounge also retains some original elements held by predecessors of the building, including the Four Seas Restaurant. It has a wall mural: the restored 1940s octogenarian painting depicting two of the Eight Immortals: philosopher Han Xiangzi playing a flute, and He Xiangu handing Han a peach. The mural is also an inspiration for the Lounge. The lounge's high ceilings hang "original brass pendants" and reveal "original redwood beams on display".

Moongate Lounge serves lunar-themed seasonal food and drink menu and wine list, different from the restaurant. The drink menu has two cocktail types: one named after moons like the Kerberos and the Io, and another based on Chinese lunar calendar, including Jingzhe (Awakening of Insects) and vernal equinox. At the lounge's debut, the food menu included dim sum dishes, like Crab Rangoon, char siu bao, bakkwa, and salt-and-pepper squid. The menu also included a large dish, the Four Seas banquet chicken, named after the restaurant's predecessor.

== Other businesses ==
The restaurant launched its side business Grand Opening in summer 2019, operated by then-pastry chef and alumnus Melissa Chou. Grand Opening offers Chinese-inspired seasonal pastries, such as pineapple bun variations, "wife cookie" (inspired from a hand pie), "black sesame banoffee pie with miso caramel", "burnt honey pie", and sponge cake variations (similar to the cakes found in Chinese bakeries). It is operated on weekends in the first floor of the restaurant. The pastry business halted in 2020 amid the COVID-19 pandemic after Chou started visiting her family in New Zealand in that spring. After she stayed there for one year, she then reopened the pastry business from hiatus in August 2021. As of December 2025, Grand Opening is no longer operating out of San Francisco, and instead lists West Oakland as both its baking and pickup locations.

On December 18, 2021, the restaurant also launched Soon and Soon Souvenir Shop, located at the Grand Avenue entrance to the restaurant. The shop sells merchandise, Chinese baked goods, Hong Kong-inspired coffee menu, and alcoholic beverages. It also was named after Jew's grandfather's laundry service.

== See also ==
- List of Michelin-starred restaurants in California
