= Hoogan et Beaufort =

Restaurant in Montreal, Quebec, Canada

- Interactive map of Hoogan et Beaufort

Restaurant information
- Established: 2015
- Owners: Marc-André Jetté; William Saulnier
- Head chef: Marc-André Jetté
- Food type: Canadian
- Rating: (Michelin Guide)
- Location: Montreal, Quebec, Canada
- Coordinates: 45.5421°N 73.5635°W
- Seating capacity: 70
- Website: www.hooganetbeaufort.com

Hoogan et Beaufort is a Michelin-starred restaurant in Montreal, Quebec, Canada.

== History ==
The restaurant opened in 2015, operating out of a converted factory in the redeveloped Technopôle Angus subdivision in Montreal's Rosemont neighbourhood.

== Concept ==
Hoogan et Beaufort serves its menu in both a la carte and tasting menu formats, offering a wine pairing for the latter at two different price points.

The restaurant cooks its dishes over wood-fire, including many of its desserts.

== Recognition ==
In 2025, the business received a 'Recommended' designation in Quebec's inaugural Michelin Guide. In the 2026 publication of the guide the restaurant was upgraded to a Michelin star, highlighting its wood-fired cooking, utilization of fresh ingredients, and praising the 'superb' wine list and cocktail options.

Hoogan et Beaufort's sommelier, Hugo Duchesne, has received commendation for his curated wine list at the restaurant. Duchesne was awarded the 'Michelin Sommelier Award' by the guide for the Quebec region in 2026.

Canada's 100 Best Restaurants ranked Hoogan et Beaufort at #43 in 2017, and then again at #96 in 2024.

== See also ==
- List of Michelin-starred restaurants in Quebec
