= Le Clan (restaurant) =

Restaurant in Quebec City, Canada

- Interactive map of Le Clan

Restaurant information
- Established: September 21, 2021
- Owners: Stéphane Modat; Yanick Parent
- Chef: Stéphane Modat
- Food type: Quebecois
- Rating: (Michelin Guide)
- Location: Quebec City, Canada
- Coordinates: 46.8119°N 71.2074°W
- Seating capacity: 90
- Website: restaurantleclan.com/en/

Le Clan is a Michelin-starred restaurant in Quebec City, Canada. Stéphane Modat is the chef.

== History ==
The restaurant was opened in September 2021 by chef Stéphane Modat and restauranteur Yanick Parent. Prior to opening the restaurant, Modat served as the head chef of Quebec's historic Château Frontenac hotel.

== Concept ==
Le Clan serves Quebecois cuisine sourcing much of its ingredients from the boreal forests of the region. The restaurant accentuates its meat use, including game meat, and its interiors are decorated with hunting trophies.

It offers the choice of either a four or six course tasting menu at dinner, as well as fixed menus for lunch and Sunday brunch.

The restaurant's name, Le Clan, comes from Modat's belief that his 'clan' of family, friends, restaurant employees and suppliers form the basis for the concept and success of his restaurant.

== Recognition ==
In 2025, the business received a 'Recommended' designation in Quebec's inaugural Michelin Guide. In the 2026 publication of the guide the restaurant was upgraded to a Michelin star, praising its focus on Quebec-sourced meats.

The business has also gained recognition for its wine list curated by master sommelier Pier-Alexis Soulière, who was named Canada's best sommelier in 2020.

Writing for The Globe and Mail in 2023, food writer Eric Andrew-Gee highlighted the Le Clan's lunch menu, singling out its hare meatballs as the best dish he ate in Quebec City.

US-based online food publication Eater ranked Le Clan among its 28 best restaurants in Quebec City.

== See also ==
- List of Michelin-starred restaurants in Quebec
