= Légende (restaurant) =

Restaurant in Quebec City, Canada

- Interactive map of Légende

Restaurant information
- Established: 2014
- Owner: Karen Therrien
- Head chef: Elliot Beaudoin
- Food type: Quebecois
- Rating: (Michelin Guide)
- Location: 255 rue Saint-Paul, Quebec City, Quebec, Canada
- Coordinates: 46.8169°N 71.2101°W
- Website: restaurantlegende.com

Légende is a Michelin-starred restaurant in Quebec City, Canada.

While maintaining a focus on fine dining, Légende is considered the more casual sister restaurant to the two-Michelin-starred Tanière³.

== Recognition ==
In 2025, the restaurant received a Michelin star in Quebec's inaugural Michelin Guide.

== See also ==
- List of Michelin-starred restaurants in Quebec
