= Europea (restaurant) =

Restaurant in Montreal, Quebec, Canada

- Interactive map of Europea

Restaurant information
- Established: 2002
- Owners: Patrice De Felice; Ludovic Delanca; Jérôme Ferrer
- Head chef: Jérôme Ferrer
- Food type: Modern
- Rating: (Michelin Guide)
- Location: 1065 rue de la Montagne, Montreal, Quebec, Canada
- Coordinates: 45.4966°N 73.5718°W
- Website: jeromeferrer.ca

Europea (also referred to as: Restaurant Jérôme Ferrer - Europea) is a Michelin-starred restaurant in Montreal, Quebec, Canada.

== History ==
Europea was opened in Downtown Montreal in 2002 by Ludovic Delonca, Patrice de Felice, and Jérôme Ferrer, with the latter serving as the head chef. The three are nationals of France, who moved to the city to start a fine dining concept after running a seasonal bistro in the Southern French village of Saint-Cyprien. Prior to opening the restaurant, the group travelled Canada to sample the country's cuisine and take influence for what to serve.

In 2019, the restaurant relocated down the street from its longtime home to a larger space within a new condominium complex. The move was made to allow for a significant expansion of the restaurant’s operations, introducing a multi-concept format that included a fine-dining room, a brasserie, an afternoon tea service, a lunch counter, and a cocktail bar. The new location also incorporated theatrical elements, to allow for a more experiential dining approach.

== Concept ==
Ferrer has cited wanting to serve cuisine that is viewed by patrons more as "an experience than as a meal", with the restaurant having three distinct concepts under its roof.

The restaurant's main dining room, styled La Grande Table Gastronomique serves a tasting menu with a significant focus on Quebec ingredients. It offers a 10 course 'signature' menu at its dinner service lasting approximately three hours, and an abridged version of its menu for lunch. Both menus include Ferrer's signature dishes such as the truffled lobster cappuccino and maple cotton candy served on a small metal tree to imitate its leaves.

Europea's brasserie concept, styled La Table Gourmande offers a separate, more affordable, table d'hote menu at lunch and dinner. With the restaurant being located one block from the Bell Centre, which hosts Montreal Canadiens hockey games and other events, the bistro also offers a pre-show three course menu.

The third concept is its Le Comptoir Cuisine, serving dessert items like crepes and gelato, as well as to-go lunch box meals.

== Recognition ==
In 2025, the restaurant received a Michelin star in Quebec's inaugural Michelin Guide. Michelin highlighted chef Jérôme Ferrer's ability to fuse French culinary tactics with the terroir and premium ingredients available in Quebec.

Lesley Chesterman, the Montreal Gazette's restaurant critic, gave Europea 3 1/2 out of 4 stars in her 2009 review, noting its elaborate sequence of extras that accompanied the multi-course meal.

Lapresse food critic Marie-Claude Lortie gave a positive review to Europea in 2013, singling out its theatrical service style and succession of supplemental dishes, noting that Ferrer’s combination of traditional French technique and contemporary culinary methods produced a polished and memorable dining experience.

Vermont-based newspaper Seven Days food writer Corin Hirsch praised Europea for its theatrical tasting-menu experience in her 2014 review, describing the meal as “sublime, diaphanous, intoxicating.” She highlighted the restaurant’s blend of Quebec-sourced ingredients and elaborate presentation, noting it as a memorable example of Ferrer’s culinary style.

Ottawa Citizen restaurant critic Peter Hum reviewed Europea's lunch menu in 2014, highlighting its elaborate hospitality, signature dishes such as the truffled lobster cappuccino, and what he described as strong value for money in its lunch service.

In 2015, travel website TripAdvisor named Europea the second best restaurant in the world.

=== Canada's 100 Best Restaurants Ranking ===
The restaurant has appeared on Canada's 100 Best Restaurants list in the early years of its publication, but has not ranked since 2017.

Europea
Year	Rank	Change
2016	50	new
2017	57	▼7
2018	▼ No Rank	
2019	▼ No Rank	
2020	▼ No Rank	
2021	No List	
2022	▼ No Rank	
2023	▼ No Rank	
2024	▼ No Rank	
2025	▼ No Rank	
2026	▼ No Rank	

== Controversy ==
In 2025, La Presse published an investigation in which several former employees alleged a toxic work environment and verbal abuse from Ferrer in Europea's kitchen between 2006 and 2025. The allegations were disputed by both Ferrer and some former staff who were interviewed, describing the restaurant as demanding but professionally beneficial.

The restaurant was fined at its former location by provincial health inspectors in 2017 for a dead rat found on its premises and the presence of mold.

== See also ==
- List of Michelin-starred restaurants in Quebec
