= Red Paper Clip =

Restaurant in New York City

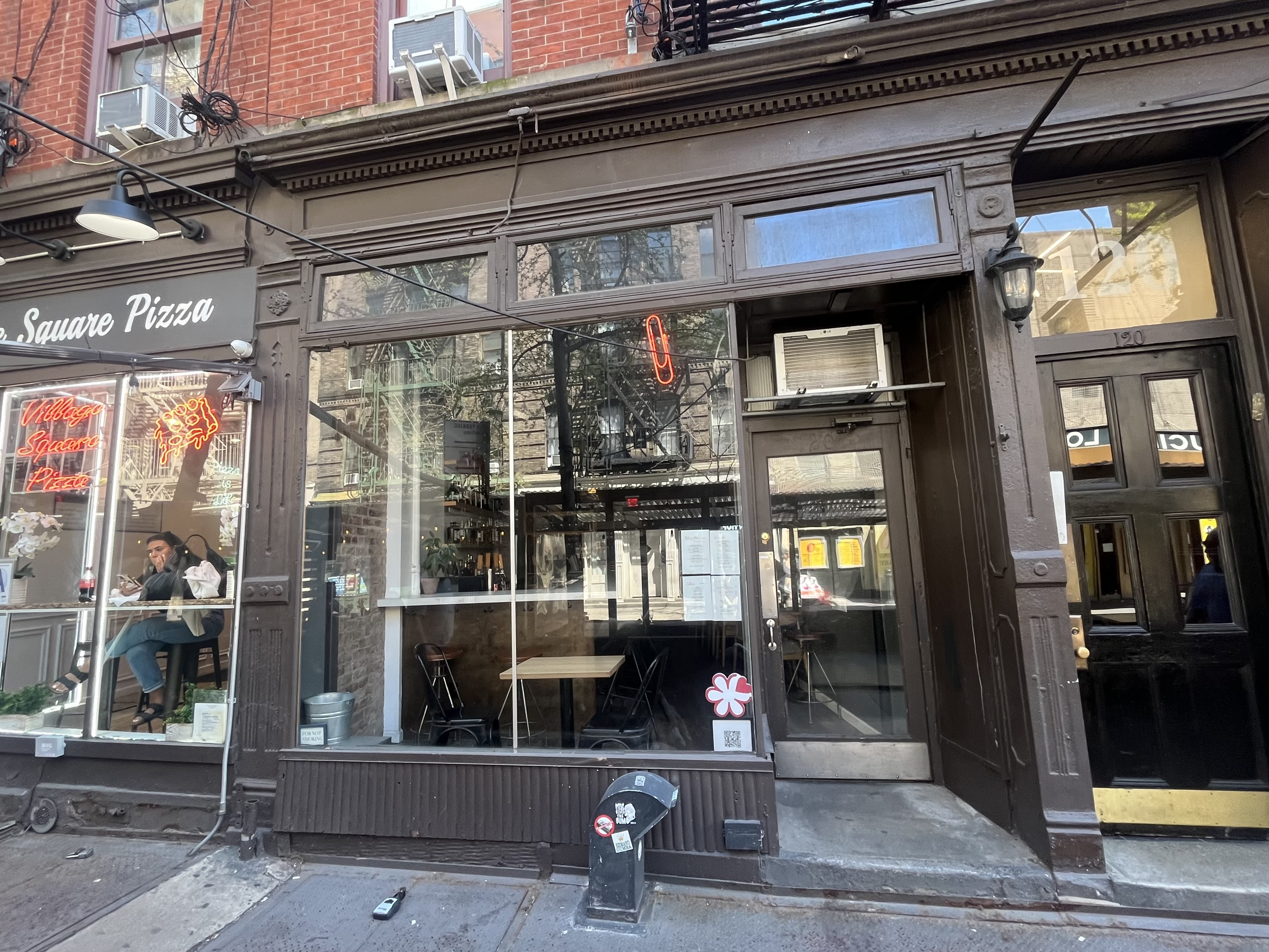
- Red Paper Clip in April 2024
- Interactive map of Red Paper Clip

Restaurant information
- Food type: New American with Taiwanese influences
- Rating: (Michelin Guide) (2022-2024)
- Location: 120 Christopher Street, New York City, New York, 10014, United States
- Coordinates: 40°43′59.2″N 74°0′20.3″W

Red Paper Clip is a Michelin-rated restaurant in New York City in the West Village. The restaurant opened in 2019 and serves Modern American food with Taiwanese influences with an a la carte and tasting menu. The focus of the menu is seasonal ingredients with an emphasis on contemporary American dishes with Asian forward flavors.

== Reviews and accolades ==
=== Reviews ===
Ryan Sutton, writing for Eater New York, gave the restaurant a mixed review in 2019. In a similarly mixed review published by The Infatuation, Matt Tervooren wrote that the restaurant was "good" and "at moments...great" but was not "impressive enough to justify the high price tag.".

=== Accolades ===
The restaurant was awarded a Michelin star in 2022, 2023 and 2024.

== See also ==
- List of Michelin-starred restaurants in New York City
