= Havana (restaurant) =

- Interactive map of Havana

Restaurant information
- Established: 1997 (29 years ago)
- Owners: Michael Boland; Deirdre Swords
- Head chef: Cassady Pappas
- Food type: Cuban-influenced
- Location: 318 Main Street, Bar Harbor, Hancock County, Maine, 04609, United States
- Coordinates: 44.3841287°N 68.203186°W
- Website: www.havanamaine.com

Havana is a restaurant in downtown Bar Harbor, Maine, United States. Established in 1997 by Michael Boland and his wife Deirdre Swords, the restaurant has received several awards, most notably for its wine list, which has achieved Wine Spectator's Award for Excellence every year since 2004. A Cubano-influenced restaurant, it has an attached outdoor bar, the Havana Parrilla Tapas Bar and Grill, converted from a garage in 2003.

Sitting United States president Barack Obama dined at the restaurant on July 17, 2010, during his family's vacation on Mount Desert Island. The president had paella and the first lady, Michelle Obama, had lobster thermidor. It was the first presidential visit to the island since that of Howard Taft exactly a century earlier.

Head bartender Mark "Duffy" Dyer worked at the restaurant between 1997 and 2023.

Boland and Swords opened a sister restaurant, named Havana South, in Portland, Maine, in 2010, but it closed shortly thereafter.

During the COVID-19 pandemic, Esquire included Havana in its list of "100 restaurants America can't afford to lose".
