= Kebec Club Privé =

Restaurant in Quebec City, Canada

- Interactive map of Kebec Club Privé

Restaurant information
- Established: November 2019
- Owners: Cassandre Osterroth; Pierre-Olivier Pelletier
- Head chef: Cassandre Osterroth; Pierre-Olivier Pelletier
- Food type: Creative
- Rating: (Michelin Guide)
- Location: 767 rue Saint-Joseph Est, Quebec City, Quebec, Canada
- Coordinates: 46.8157°N 71.2196°W
- Seating capacity: 10
- Website: www.kebecclubprive.ca

Kebec Club Privé is a Michelin-starred restaurant in Quebec City, Canada.

== History ==
The restaurant was opened in November 2019, and is co-owned by Cassandre Osterroth and Pierre-Olivier Pelletier, who also serve as the co-head chefs. Osterroth and Pelletier met while working at Laurie Raphaël restaurant.

== Concept ==
The meal is served supper club style, seating only ten people a night at one communal table.

== Recognition ==
In 2025, the restaurant received a Michelin star in Quebec's inaugural Michelin Guide. It is the only Michelin-starred restaurant in the province headed by a female executive chef.

== See also ==
- List of Michelin-starred restaurants in Quebec
