= Mastard =

Restaurant in Montreal, Quebec, Canada

- Interactive map of Mastard

Restaurant information
- Established: January 6, 2021
- Owner: Simon Mathys
- Head chef: Simon Mathys
- Food type: Modern
- Rating: (Michelin Guide)
- Location: 1879 rue Belanger, Montreal, Quebec, Canada
- Coordinates: 45.5472°N 73.603°W
- Website: restaurantmastard.com

Mastard is a Michelin-starred restaurant in Montreal, Quebec, Canada.

== History ==
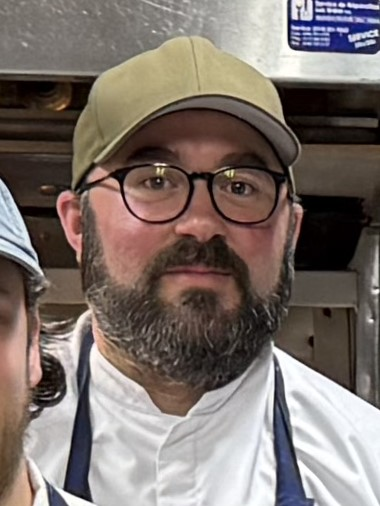
Chef Simon Mathys

The restaurant was opened in January 2021 by chef-owner Simon Mathys, during the peak of the COVID-19 pandemic, a period when restaurants in Quebec faced strict public health restrictions on operations, including limits on dining capacity and interprovincial travel.

Mathys had previously served as head chef at the well-regarded Montreal fine dining restaurant Manitoba, which closed in the early stages of the pandemic. He cited the closure of Manitoba as a catalyst for accelerating his long-standing goal of opening his own restaurant, providing him with an opportunity to establish a new culinary concept under his own direction.

At its opening, the restaurant offered a three-course tasting menu priced at 35 CAD, aimed at attracting guests from the local neighbourhood. This approach was in part a response to the severe restrictions on travel into Quebec from other provinces, which limited the potential customer base and emphasized the importance of appealing to nearby diners.

Mathys selected the restaurant's name from the French word meaning "big and brawny".

== Concept ==
The restaurant serves a regularly changing five-course tasting menu, with a significant focus on Quebecois ingredients and flavours.

Mastard offers an optional wine pairing and a wine list made of privately-imported bottles, featuring items not often sold at Quebec's state-owned alcohol board.

== Recognition ==
In 2025, the restaurant received a Michelin star in Quebec's inaugural Michelin Guide. Michelin praised chef Simon Mathys's "unabashedly original carte blanche menu" and use of scientific precision in the dishes served.

Mastard was ranked #2 in Air Canada's annual list of 10 best new restaurants in Canada in 2022. Air Canada highlighted the restaurant's emphasis on "local, farm-fresh ingredients" in its cooking.

Writing for Maclean's Magazine in 2023, restaurant critic Chris Nuttall-Smith ranked Mastard among the 20 best places to eat in Canada. He cited chef-owner Mathys's food as "playful, original [and] exhilarating", praising the chef as "a soft-spoken star [in Quebec's] culinary scene".

=== Canada's 100 Best Restaurants Ranking ===
The restaurant has appeared on Canada's 100 Best Restaurants ranking annually since debuting on the list in 2022. Mastard peaked at #40 in the 2025 edition.

Mastard
Year	Rank	Change
2022	81	new
2023	55	▲26
2024	73	▼18
2025	40	▲33
2026	63	▼23

== Gallery ==
Sample of a five-course, blind tasting menu at Mastard, in chronological order.
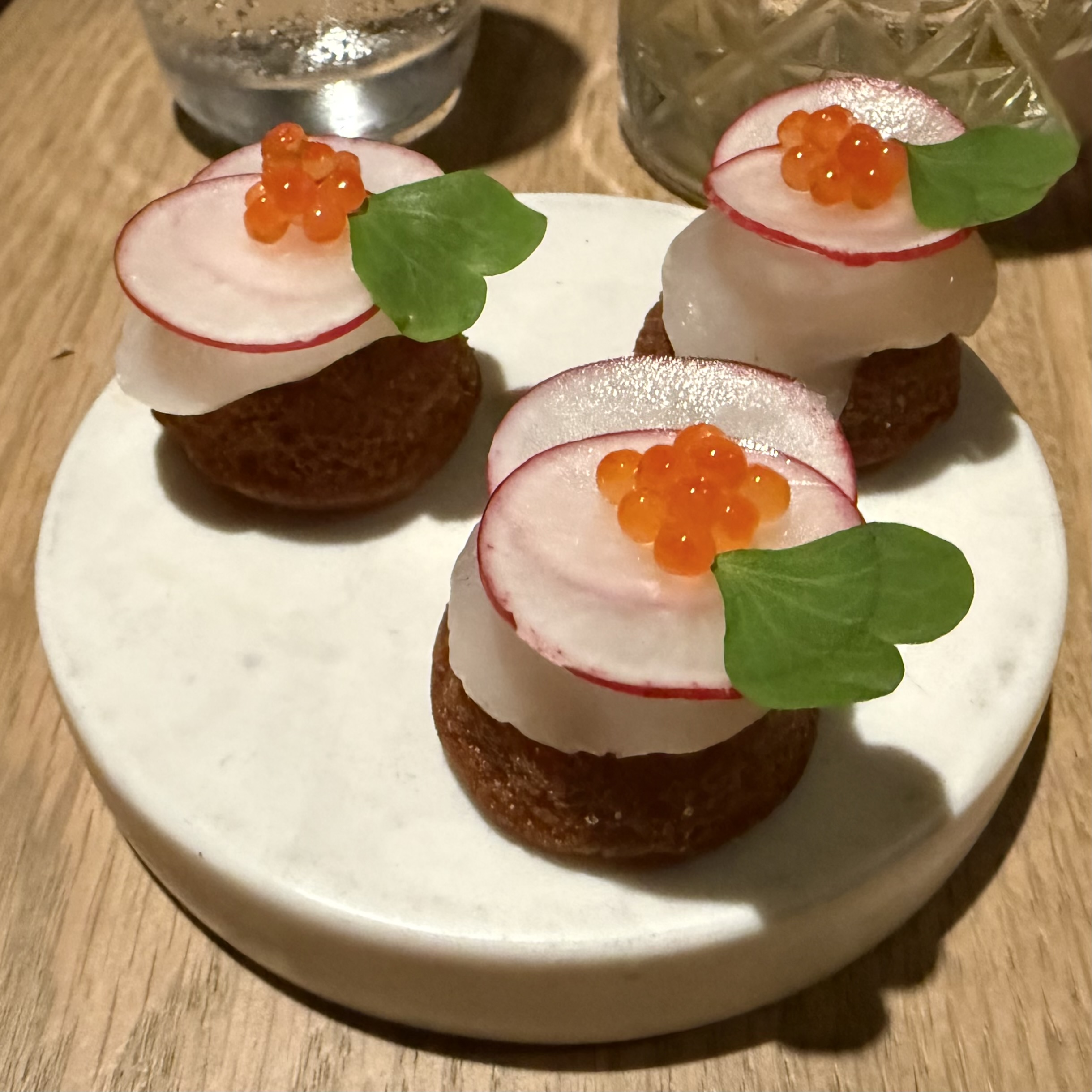
Canapés

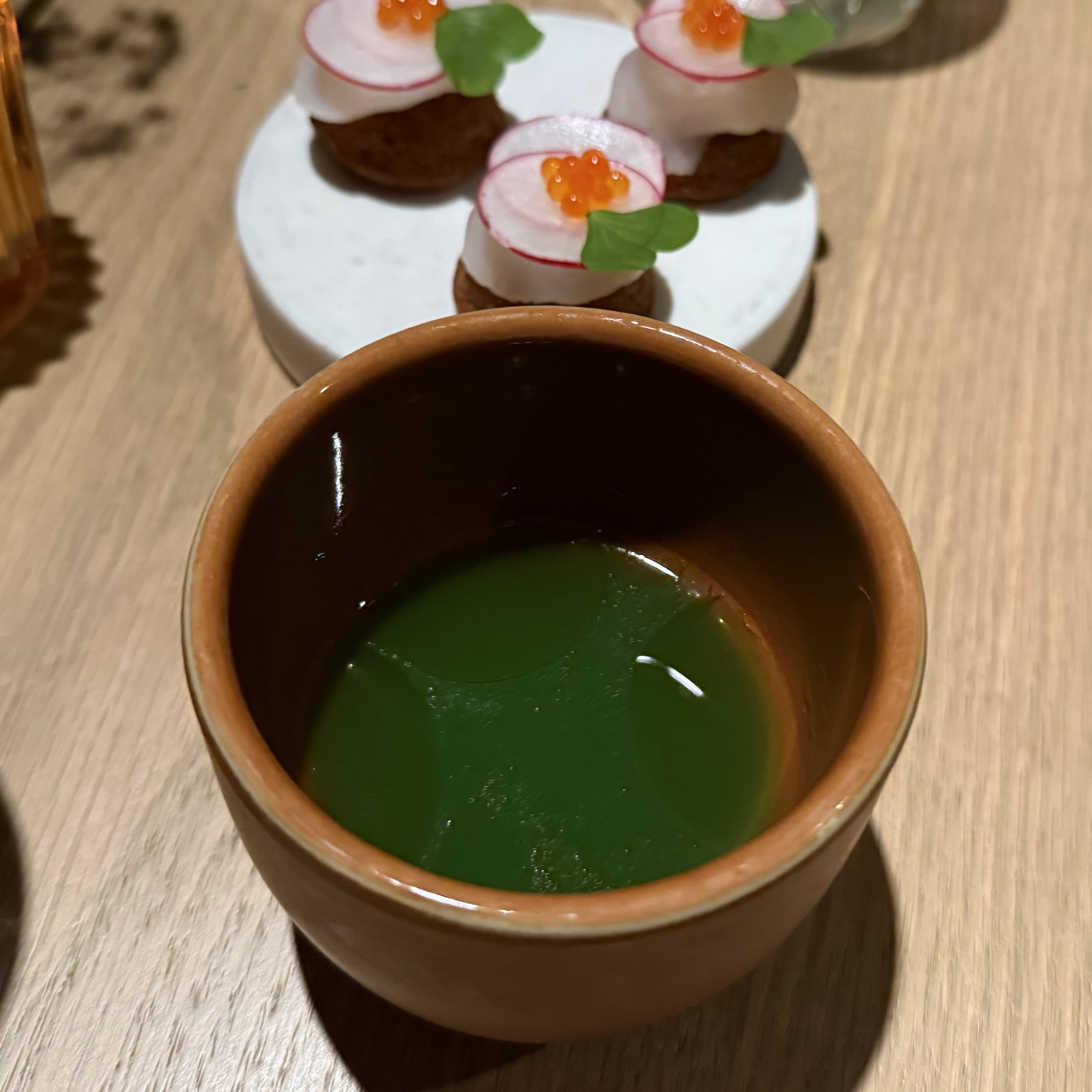
Amuse-bouche

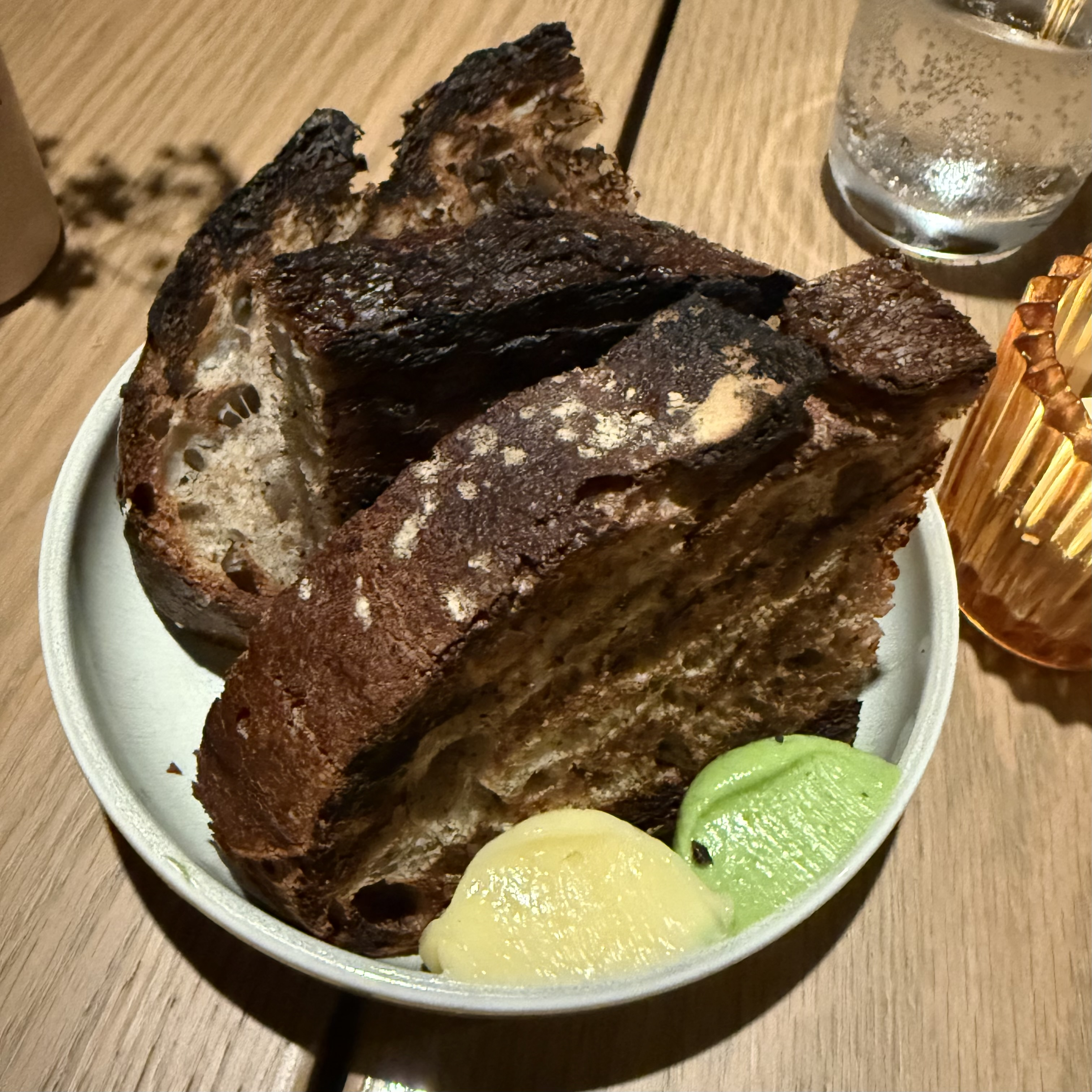
Table bread

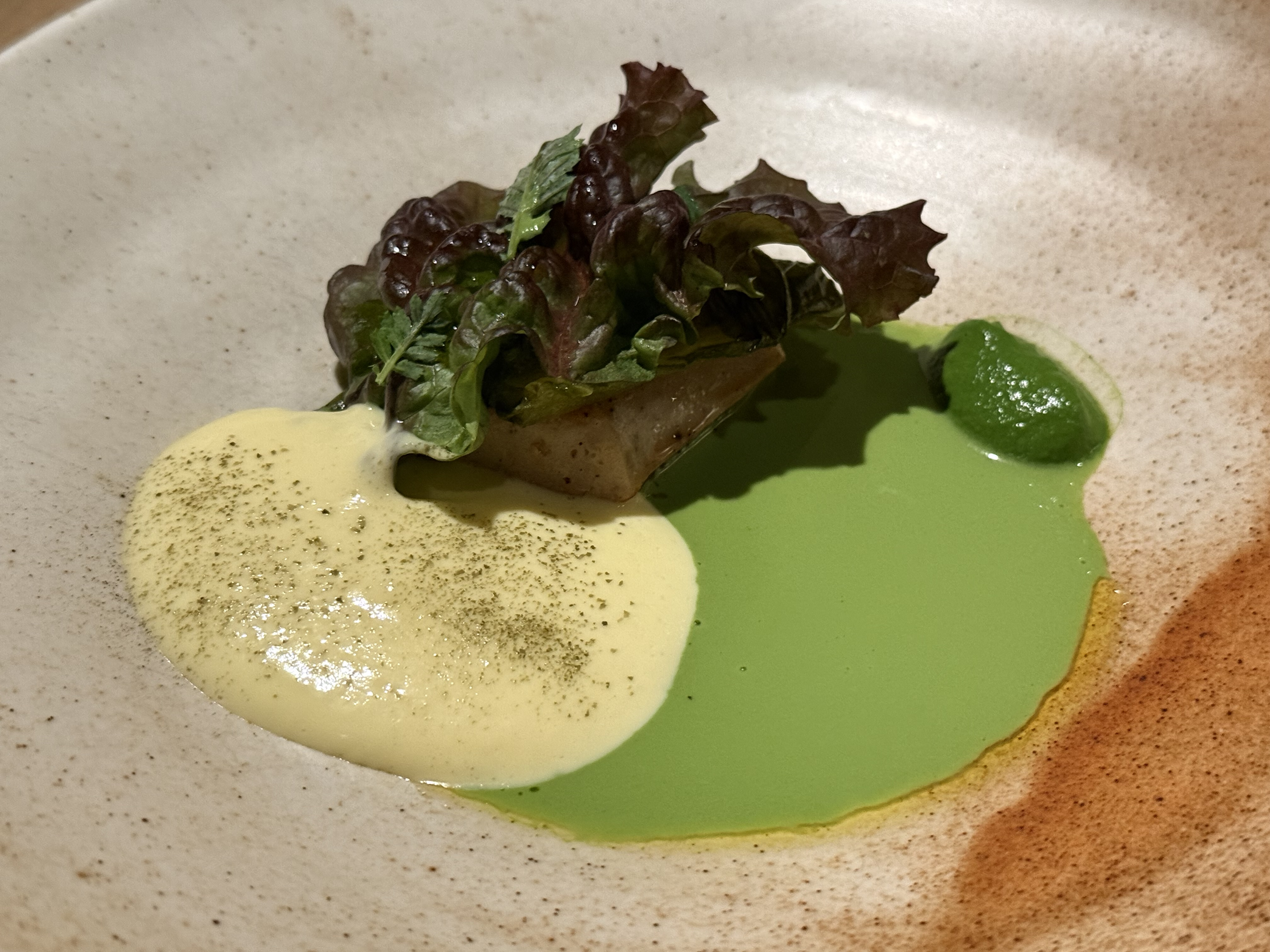
"Lettuce - Squid - Sabayon" (first course)

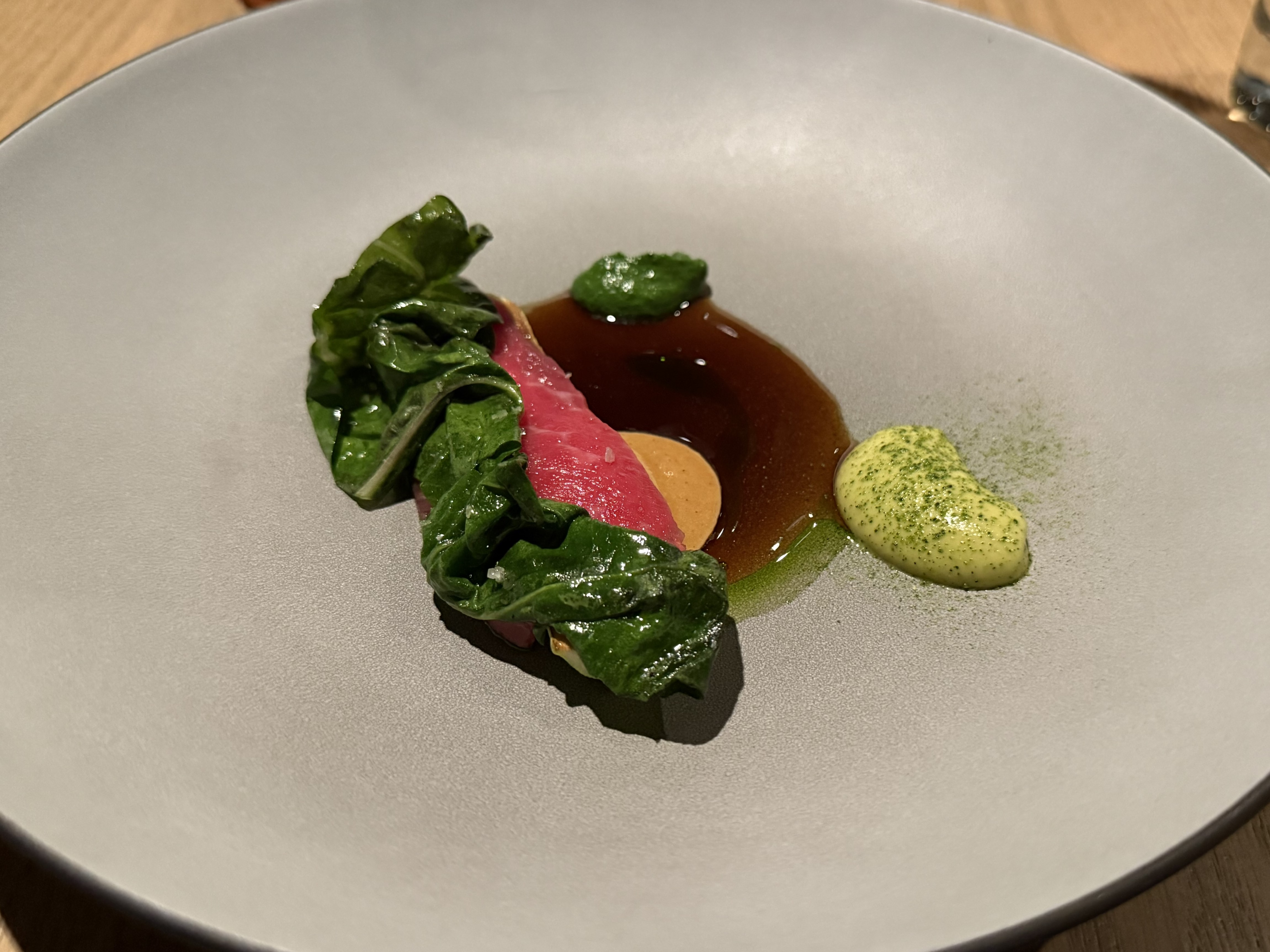
"Zucchini - Beef - Mint" (second course)

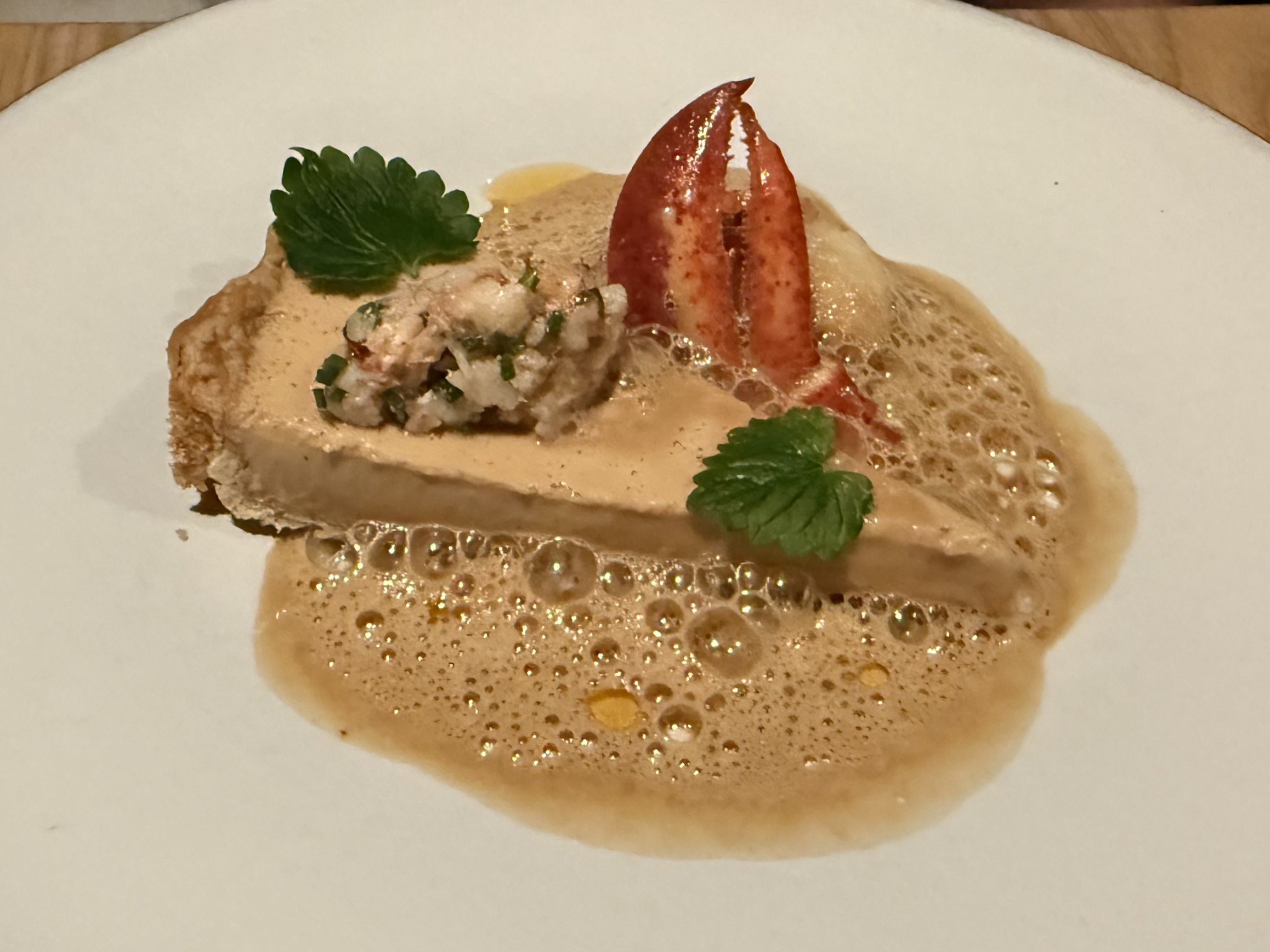
Supplementary course: foie gras and lobster in several forms, combined in several ways

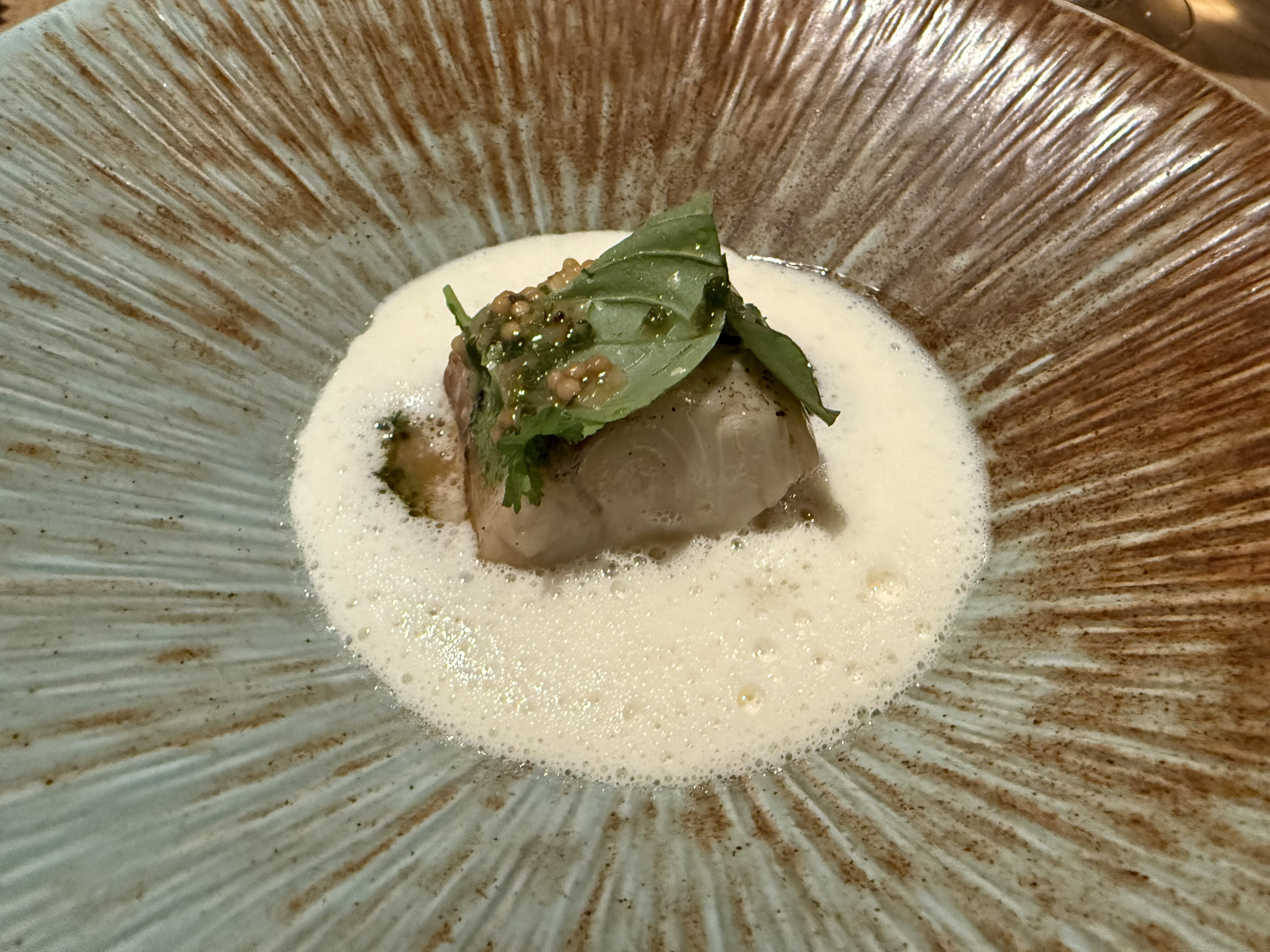
"Walleye - Leek - Mustard" (third course)

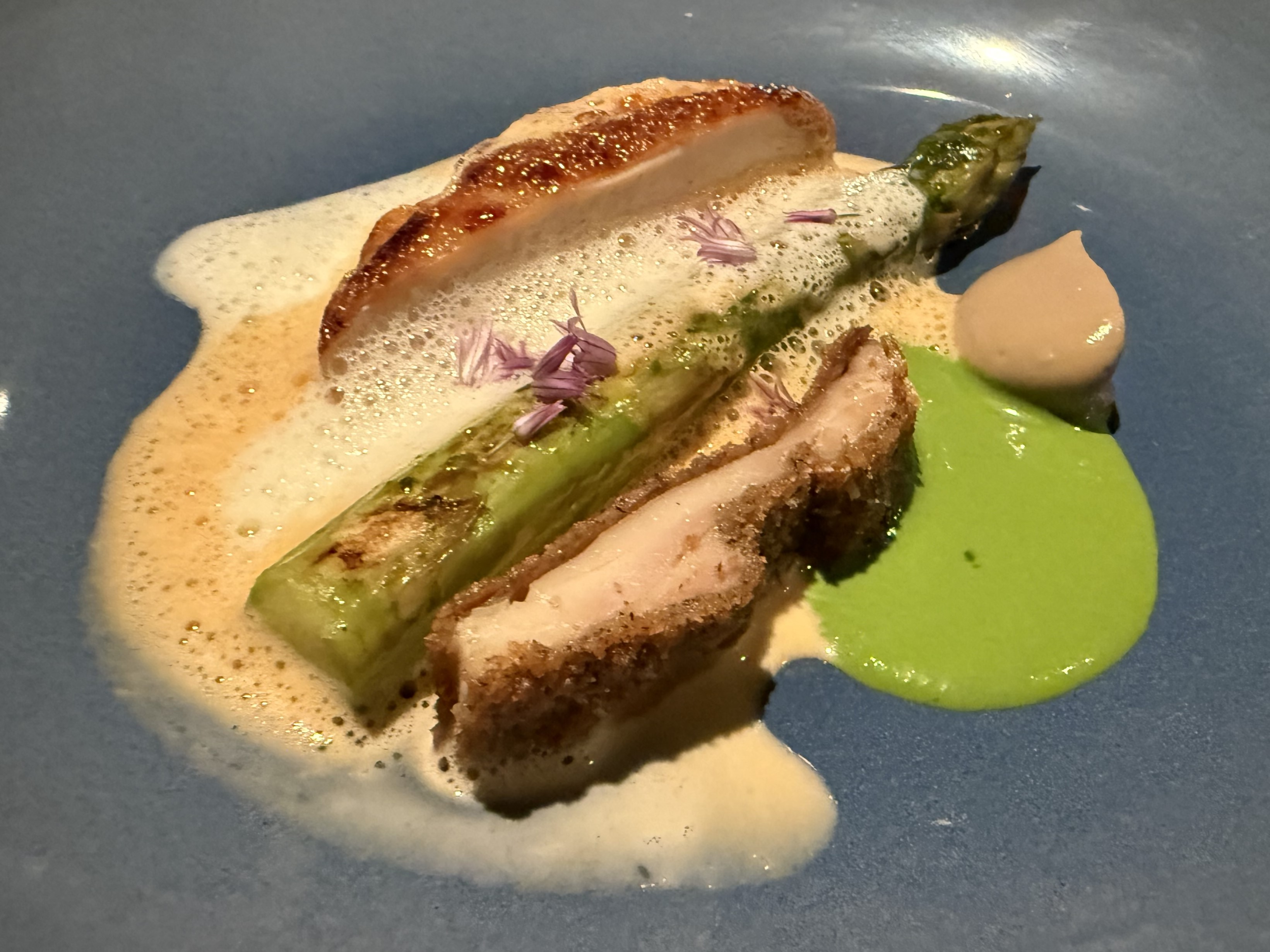
"Cornish Hen - Asparagus - Lobster" (fourth course)

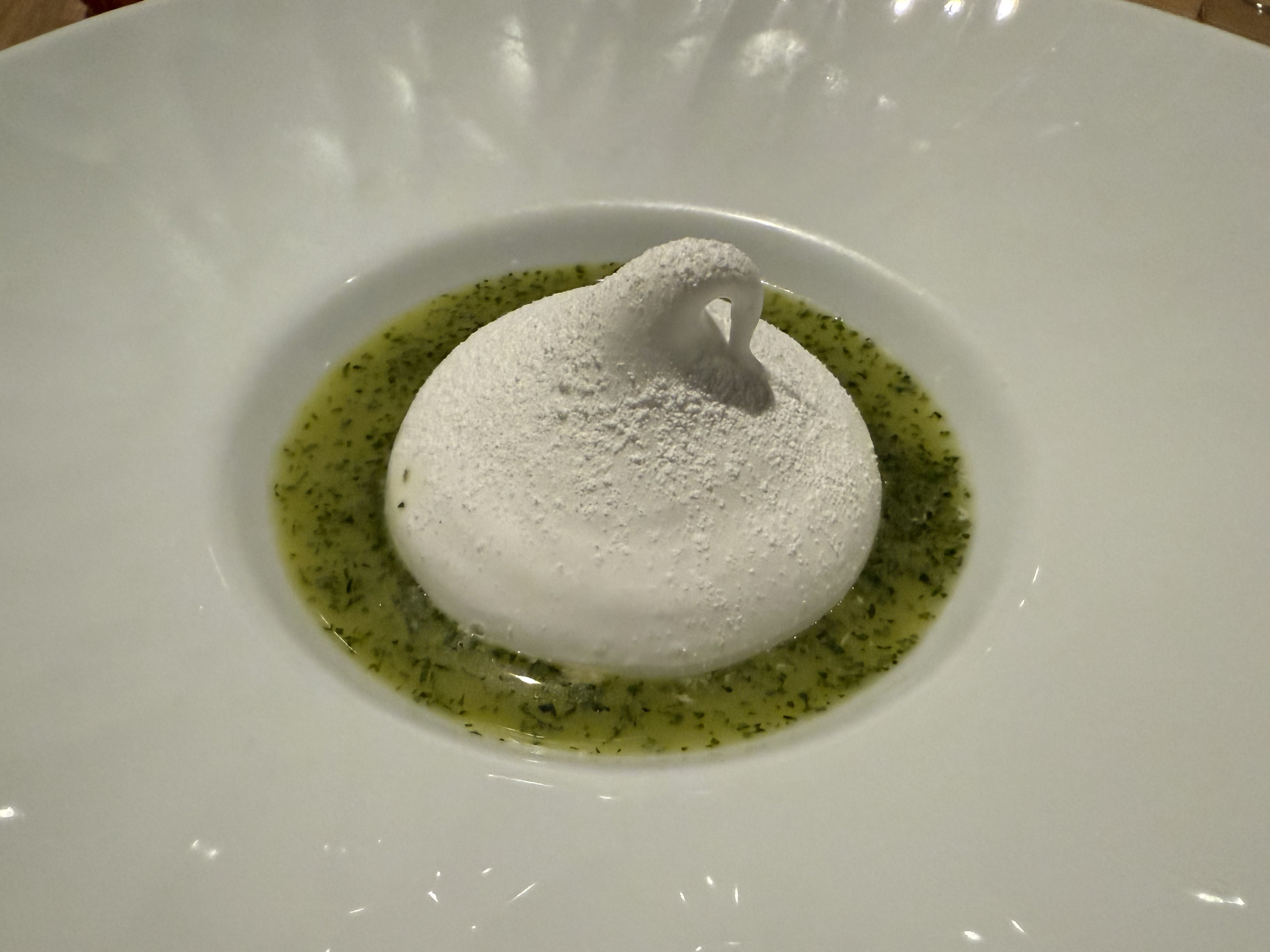
"Meringue - Vanilla - Rhubarb" (fifth, dessert course)

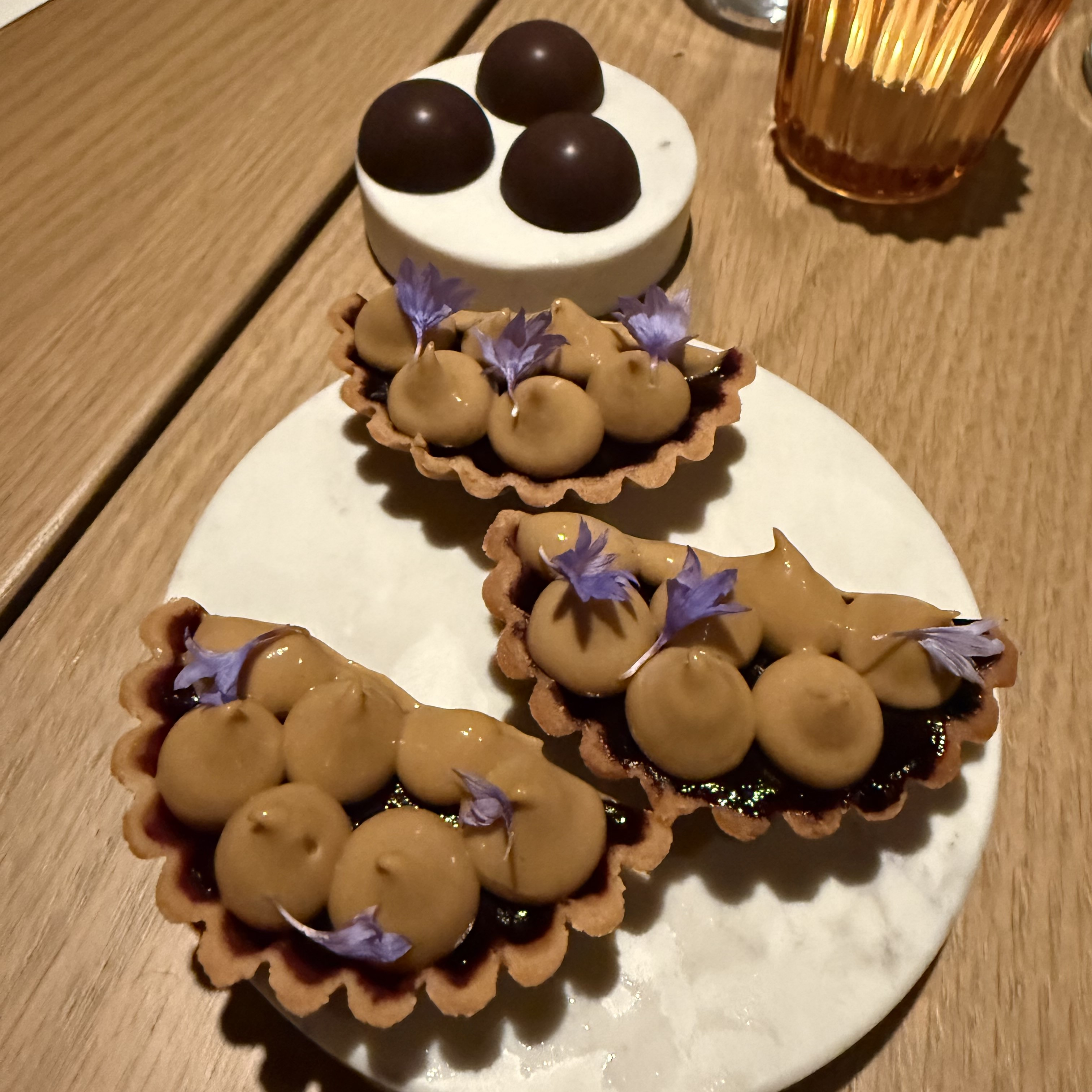
Mignardises & petit four
5 main courses plus traditional small French courses and one supplementary course.

== See also ==
- List of Michelin-starred restaurants in Quebec
