= Tanière³ =

Restaurant in Quebec City, Canada

- Interactive map of Tanière³

Restaurant information
- Established: 1977
- Owners: Roxan Bourdelais; François-Emmanuel Nicol; Karen Therrien
- Manager: Roxan Bourdelais
- Head chef: François-Emmanuel Nicol
- Pastry chef: Jeremy Billy
- Food type: Quebecois
- Rating: (Michelin Guide)
- Location: 36 1/2 rue Saint-Pierre, Quebec City, Quebec, Canada
- Coordinates: 46.8135°N 71.2022°W
- Seating capacity: 40
- Website: taniere3.com

Tanière³ is a Michelin-starred restaurant in Quebec City, Canada.

== History ==
The restaurant was founded in 1977 by Laurier Therrien, initially under the name La Tanière. The original iteration of the business was located on the outskirts of Quebec City. In 2002 ownership of the restaurant was taken over by Therrien's niece, Karen, who also revamped the concept to serve a tasting menu with ingredients only from Quebec.

The business closed in 2015, before re-opening in March 2019 at a new location under the present name, Tanière³, signifying the third iteration of the restaurant. Upon its re-opening, co-owner Frédéric Laplante served as the head chef. Laplante was then succeeded by François-Emmanuel Nicol.

The new location was moved to the cellar and stone vaults of a historic 17th century building in Old Quebec. The building the restaurant operates in is designated as a UNESCO World Heritage site. Extensive renovations were undertaken to create a more refined dining experience, including a discreet entrance accessed through an unmarked alley door that requires a passcode for entry.

== Concept ==
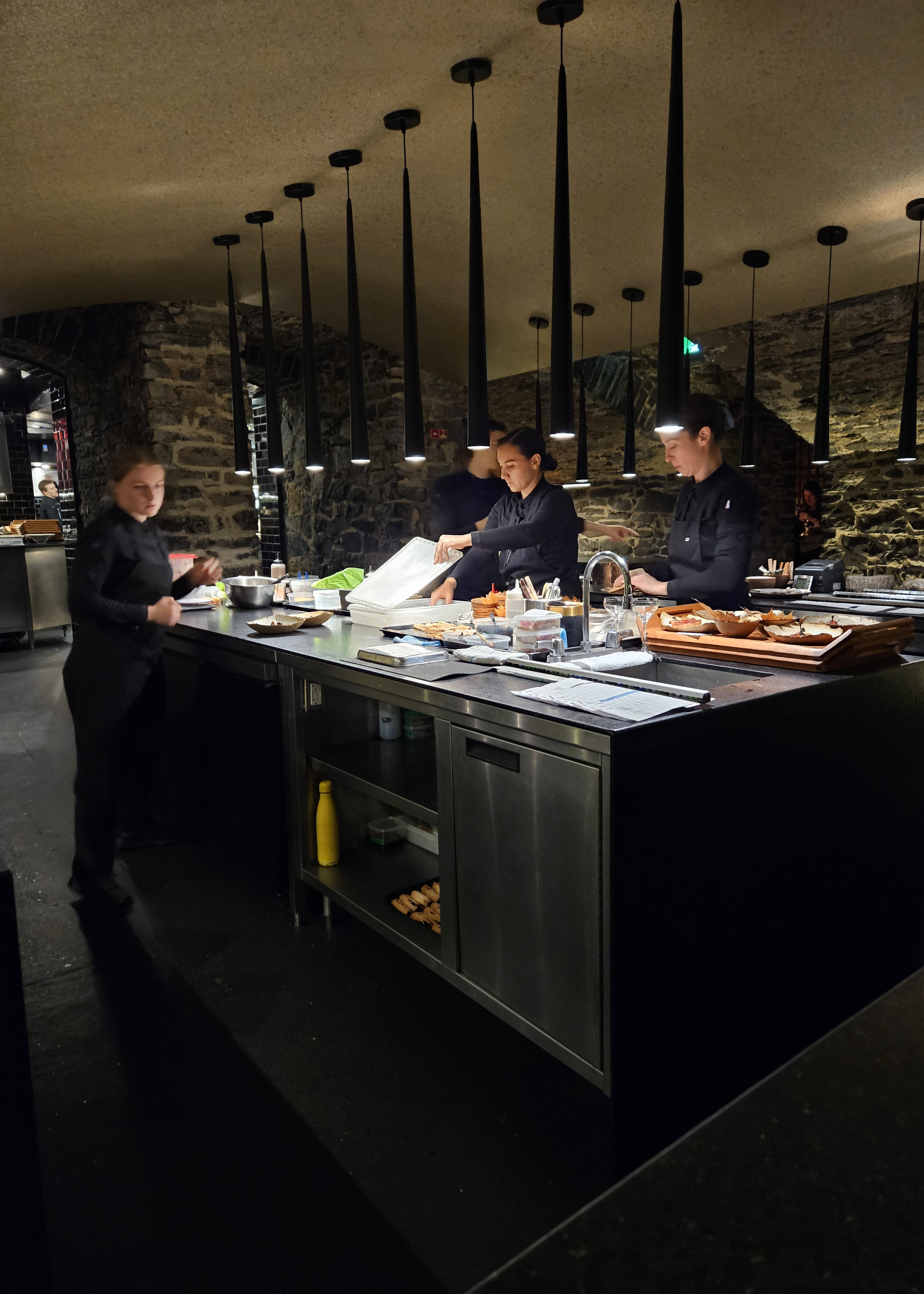
View of chefs at work from Chef's counter seating

The restaurant's cuisine and design takes strong inspiration from historical old Quebec and the nearby boreal forests. It exclusively uses ingredients that are indigenous to Quebec, and those that can only be sourced locally. The staff at the restaurant often forage for ingredients used in both the food and drink served at Tanière³, such as chaga mushrooms that are used in some of the teas, cocktails and sauces.

A blind tasting menu of between 15 and 20 courses is served at the restaurant, changing with the season and the local ingredients available for use.

Guests can choose between two dining experiences; the Dining Room Cellar or the Chef’s Counter. Optional drink pairings are also available, including a non-alcoholic pairing, a standard "Experience" pairing, and a premium "Collection" pairing featuring more exclusive beverages and ingredients.

While dining at the restaurant, guests are moved through three different parts of the windowless cellar. The experience begins in the 'Maison Charest' bar vault, where small bites and a welcome cocktail are served. The main portion of the meal takes place in a second cellar (or seating in the kitchen if the Chef's Counter experience is chosen), while desserts and aperitifs are served in the final room, the 'Dessert Vault', decorated with live birch trees.

Tanière³'s signature dish is its scallop and caviar, served regardless of season. It consists of Quebec scallops, beurre blanc, Île d'Orléans potatoes and caviar sourced from sturgeon in nearby Lac-St-Pierre.

Dessert courses are prepared by pastry chef Jeremy Billy.

== Recognition ==
In 2025, the restaurant received two Michelin stars in Quebec's inaugural Michelin Guide. It became the only restaurant awarded two stars in the province, and the second overall in Canada after Toronto's Sushi Masaki Saito. The Michelin Guide described the restaurant as a "gastronomic research laboratory," emphasizing its exclusive use of locally sourced ingredients and praising the "remarkable work" of both the sommelier and mixologist in crafting wine and cocktail pairings that complement the tasting menu.

Tanière³ was ranked #5 in the inaugural North America's 50 Best Restaurants list published in September 2025, and was also awarded the "Art of Hospitality Award" by the list for that year. It ranked #9 in the 2026 publication.

=== Canada's 100 Best Restaurants Ranking ===
The restaurant has appeared on Canada's 100 Best Restaurants ranking annually since debuting on the list in 2020. As of the 2026 publication, Tanière³ is ranked at #3, the highest it has ever placed.

Tanière³
Year	Rank	Change
2020	71	new
2021	No List	
2022	67	▲4
2023	90	▼23
2024	60	▲30
2025	13	▲47
2026	3	▲10

== See also ==
- List of Michelin-starred restaurants in Quebec
