= Sushi Nishinokaze =

Japanese restaurant in Montreal, Quebec, Canada

- Interactive map of Sushi Nishinokaze

Restaurant information
- Established: August 2022
- Owners: Julian Doan; Vincent Gee
- Head chef: Vincent Gee
- Food type: Japanese
- Rating: (Michelin Guide)
- Location: 5400 Boulevard Saint-Laurent, Montreal, Quebec, Canada
- Coordinates: 45.5251°N 73.5976°W
- Seating capacity: 8
- Website: sushinishinokaze.com

Sushi Nishinokaze is a Michelin-starred Japanese restaurant in Montreal, Quebec, Canada.

== History ==
Sushi Nishinokaze was first opened by chef-owner Vincent Gee in Toronto's Scarborough neighbourhood in August 2020. Prior to opening the restaurant, Gee worked as a sushi chef at other well-regarded omakase sushi restaurants in the city, including Shoushin.

Gee closed the business in April 2022, citing wanting to take time to further refine his sushi skills and find a new location for the business.

Montreal-based anesthesiologist Julian Doan visited the restaurant in its Scarborough location prior to closure and later convinced Gee to relocate the business to Montreal, with Doan coming on as a co-owner. It re-opened in Montreal's Mile End neighbourhood under the same name in February 2025.

== Concept ==
The restaurant serves a 24 course omakase menu, consisting primarily of Edomae-style sushi. It offers two seatings a night, with 8 guests at each time slot.

Much of the restaurant's fish is sourced from Japan, with some Canadian produce also used in the cooking. During certain seasons, most of the restaurant's fish is sourced from Canada, a rarity among sushi restaurants at that price point, which typically rely almost exclusively on imports from Japan. The fish used by Gee is cured in-house. The sushi rice used by Gee is imported from a single-origin producer in Japan.

The business's name, Nishinokaze, comes from the Japanese word for "west wind."

== Recognition ==
The restaurant received a Michelin star in the 2026 edition of Quebec's Michelin Guide. Michelin praised the chef Vincent Gee's "demanding and deeply respectful approach to Edomae tradition" in his cooking.

Travel and food publication Time Out Magazine described Sushi Nishinokaze as offering a "once-in-a-lifetime sushi experience" and praised its attention to detail, Edomae techniques, and immersive omakase experience.

=== Canada's 100 Best Restaurants Ranking ===
The restaurant debuted on Canada's 100 Best Restaurants list in its 2026 edition.

Sushi Nishinokaze
| Year | Rank | Change |
| 2026 | 31 | new |

== See also ==
- List of Japanese restaurants
- List of Michelin-starred restaurants in Quebec
- List of sushi restaurants
