= Four Kings (restaurant) =

Chinese restaurant in San Francisco, California, U.S.

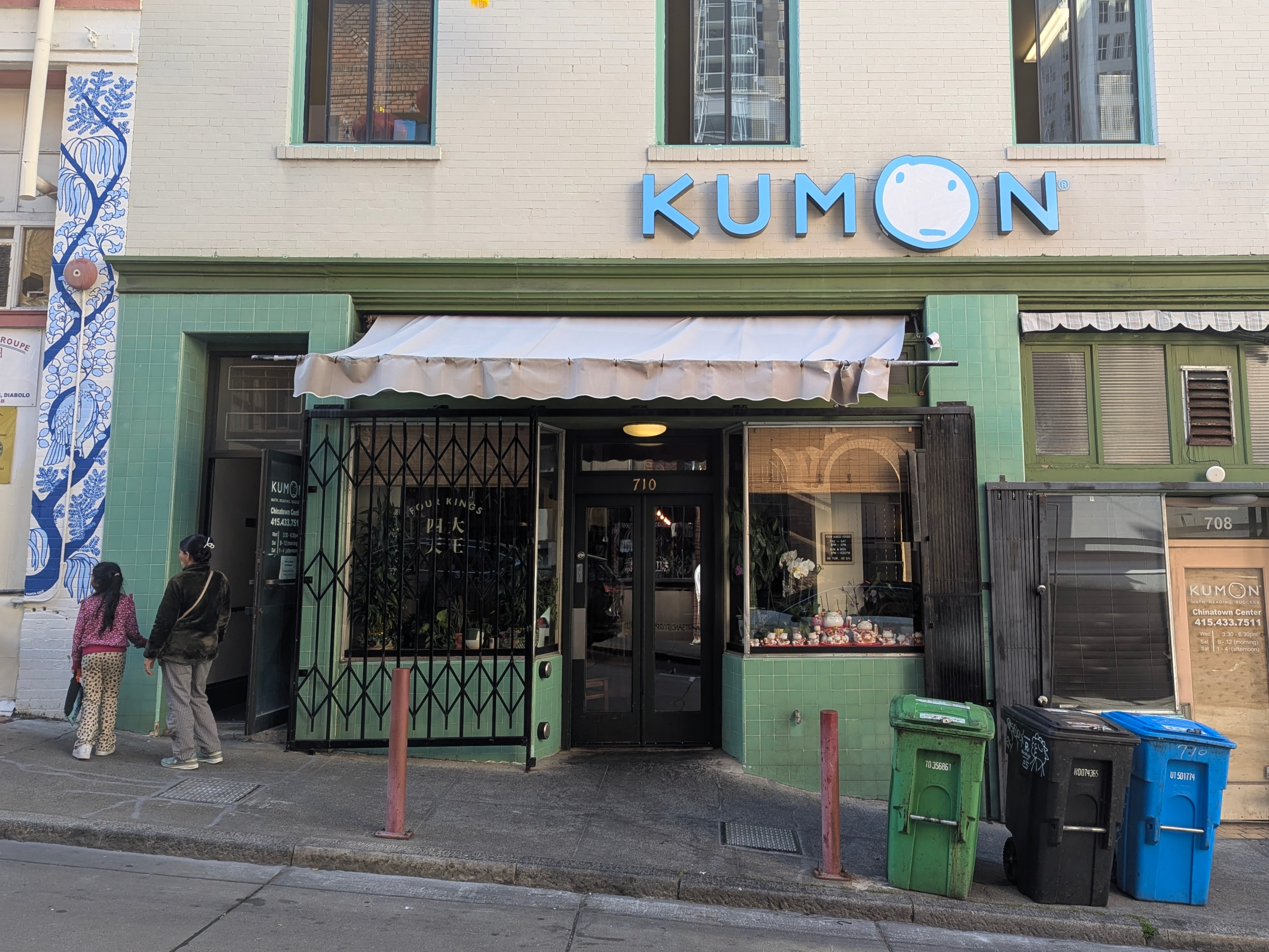
- Exterior in May 2025
- Interactive map of Four Kings

Restaurant information
- Established: March 14, 2024
- Owners: Franky Ho, Millie Boonkokua, Mike Long, Lucy Li
- Head chef: Franky Ho, Mike Long
- Food type: Cantonese
- Location: 710 Commercial St, San Francisco, California, 94108, United States
- Coordinates: 37.7940°N 122.4051°W
- Reservations: Required for tables
- Website: www.itsfourkings.com

Four Kings (Chinese: 四大天王) is a Cantonese restaurant in Chinatown, San Francisco, opened in 2024. The name is a reference to Hong Kong's Four Heavenly Kings.

== History ==
Chefs Franky Ho and Mike Long, who met while working at Mister Jiu's, opened Four Kings with their partners, Millie Boonkokua and Lucy Li, on March 14, 2024 after trialing the concept as a pop-up in locations including Buddy wine bar in San Francisco and Viridian restaurant in Oakland.

== Restaurant ==
Housed in a narrow space on the ground floor of a former shrimp factory in Chinatown, Four Kings serves Cantonese food in an atmosphere of Hong Kong nostalgia, with decor including vintage posters from the 1990s and 2000s as well as records from Ho and Long's collections and snapshots of the staff. It is named for the Four Heavenly Kings of Cantopop and plays a Cantopop playlist. Counter seating offers a view of the open kitchen.

== Reception ==
Soon after opening, Four Kings became one of the most popular new restaurants in San Francisco, drawing lines for the counter seating. It was named one of the twenty best new restaurants of 2024 by Bon Appétit, was listed in The New York Times as one of the fifty best restaurants of 2024, and was Esquire's restaurant of the year. In 2025 it was a semifinalist for the James Beard Award for best new restaurant, and was added to the Michelin Guide. The San Francisco Chronicle included it in its 2024 year-end list of the ten best new restaurants in the Bay Area, ranked it second in its 2025 list of the 100 best restaurants in the Bay Area, and ranked it first in the 2026 list.

The Michelin Guide describes Four Kings as "a lively room with quirky décor" with cooking that "taps into traditional flavors while offering a fresh perspective". San Francisco Chronicle reviewers have described it as the most fun on the newspaper's Top 100 list, "a rowdy good time" with "cheeky, drinking den vibes". A reviewer for SFGate described it as "a perfect restaurant".
