= ARVI =

Restaurant in Quebec City, Canada

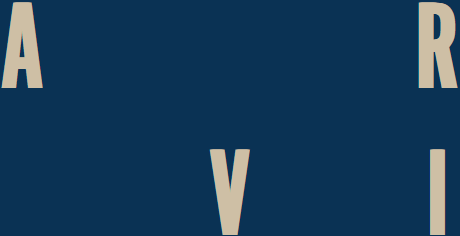
- Interactive map of ARVI

Restaurant information
- Established: July 2018
- Head chef: Julien Masia
- Food type: Modern
- Rating: (Michelin Guide)
- Location: 519 3e Avenue, Quebec City, Quebec, Canada
- Coordinates: 46.8234°N 71.2272°W
- Website: www.restaurantarvi.ca

ARVI is a Michelin-starred restaurant in Quebec City, Canada.

== Recognition ==
In 2025, the restaurant received a Michelin star in Quebec's inaugural Michelin Guide. It was ranked #1 in Air Canada's annual list of 10 best new restaurants in Canada in 2019.

=== Canada's 100 Best Restaurants Ranking ===
The restaurant debuted on Canada's 100 Best Restaurants in 2020 at number 48. It ranked annually each year until the 2025 publication, when it fell off the list.

ARVI
Year	Rank	Change
2020	48	new
2021	No List	
2022	97	▼4
2023	78	▲19
2024	89	▼11
2025	▼ No Rank	
2026	▼ No Rank	

== See also ==
- List of Michelin-starred restaurants in Quebec
