= List of Michelin-starred restaurants in Quebec =

As of the 2026 Michelin Guide, there are 13 restaurants in the Canadian province of Quebec with a Michelin star rating.

The Michelin Guides have been published by the French tire company Michelin since 1900. They were designed as a guide to tell drivers about eateries they recommended to visit and to subtly sponsor their tires, by encouraging drivers to use their cars more and therefore need to replace the tires as they wore out. Over time, the stars that were given out started to become more valuable.

Multiple anonymous Michelin inspectors visit the restaurants several times. They rate the restaurants on five criteria: "quality of products", "mastery of flavor and cooking techniques", "the personality of the chef represented in the dining experience", "value for money", and "consistency between inspectors' visits". Inspectors have at least ten years of expertise and create a list of popular restaurants supported by media reports, reviews, and diner popularity. If they reach a consensus, Michelin awards restaurants from one to three stars based on its evaluation methodology: One star means "high-quality cooking, worth a stop", two stars signify "excellent cooking, worth a detour", and three stars denote "exceptional cuisine, worth a special journey". The stars are not permanent and restaurants are constantly being re-evaluated. If the criteria are not met, the restaurant will lose its stars.

Michelin announced in August 2024 that it would issue a guide for Quebec, and that anonymous inspectors would begin to assess restaurants in the province. The inaugural guide was published on May 15, 2025, funded in partnership in a three-year contract with multiple government and tourism agencies in the province, including Destination Québec Cité, Canada Economic Development for Quebec Regions, and the Quebec Tourism Industry Alliance.

== List ==
Key
1 Michelin star	One Michelin star
2 Michelin stars	Two Michelin stars
—	The restaurant did not receive a star that year

Michelin-starred restaurants
Name	Cuisine	Location	2025	2026
ARVI	Modern	Quebec City – Limoilou	1 Michelin star	1 Michelin star
Auberge Saint-Mathieu	Nordic	Saint-Mathieu-du-Parc	—	1 Michelin star
Europea	French	Montreal – Ville-Marie	1 Michelin star	1 Michelin star
Hoogan et Beaufort	Canadian	Montreal – Rosemont	—	1 Michelin star
Kebec Club Privé	Creative	Quebec City – Saint-Roch	1 Michelin star	1 Michelin star
Laurie Raphaël	Modern	Quebec City – La Cité	1 Michelin star	1 Michelin star
Le Clan	Quebecois	Quebec City – La Cité	—	1 Michelin star
Légende	Quebecois	Quebec City – La Cité	1 Michelin star	1 Michelin star
Mastard	Canadian	Montreal – Rosemont	1 Michelin star	1 Michelin star
Narval	Modern	Rimouski	1 Michelin star	1 Michelin star
Sabayon	Contemporary	Montreal – Le Sud-Ouest	1 Michelin star	1 Michelin star
Sushi Nishinokaze	Japanese	Montreal – Le Plateau	—	1 Michelin star
Tanière³	Quebecois	Quebec City – La Cité	2 Michelin stars	2 Michelin stars
Reference				

== Criticism ==
The debut selection of restaurants in the guide elicited some criticism, in particular with regard to the limited stars awarded in Montreal. Five Quebec City restaurants received stars in comparison to three in Montreal, despite the latter having triple the population and often being considered a premier dining destination internationally. Quebec City restaurants also received more 'Bib Gourmand' designations than Montreal, which are awarded to restaurants offering "exceptionally good food at moderate prices".

Former Montreal Gazette restaurant critic Lesley Chesterman stated she felt "unpleasantly surprised" by the list, and that there was "shock" in the local food and drink community that Quebec City earned more stars than Montreal. Cult MTL magazine food editor Clay Sandhu argued that the selections show that "Michelin doesn't understand Montreal". The relatively low number of stars awarded in Montreal also garnered international attention, with Todd Plummer of the New York Post noting zero “Michelin Green Stars” in Montreal, awarded to restaurants with sustainable practices, despite the number of restaurants in the city known for its urban agriculture and low-impact sourcing.

Toqué! chef-owner Normand Laprise, whose restaurant received a 'Recommended' designation in the Guide in 2025, stated he was puzzled by the description of his restaurant provided by Michelin, claiming it did not accurately reflect the food served.

Questions were raised by those in the restaurant and tourism sectors of the Outaouais region, which includes Gatineau and the northern suburbs of Ottawa, regarding the absence of local restaurants in the guide. Despite being Quebec's third-largest metropolitan area and within the guide's catchment zone, the Outaouais received no recognition, including no establishments listed as "recommended" or awarded a Bib Gourmand. In a statement, Michelin confirmed that its inspectors had visited the region in 2025 but did not find any restaurants that met the criteria for inclusion in the guide.

== See also ==
- List of Michelin-starred restaurants in Toronto
- List of Michelin-starred restaurants in Vancouver
- List of Michelin Bib Gourmand restaurants in Canada
- List of restaurants in Canada
- Lists of restaurants
