= Auberge Saint-Mathieu =

Restaurant in Saint-Mathieu-du-Parc, Quebec, Canada

- Interactive map of Auberge Saint-Mathieu

Restaurant information
- Owner: Samy Benabed
- Chef: Samy Benabed
- Location: Quebec, Canada
- Coordinates: 46.5782°N 72.9277°W

Auberge Saint-Mathieu is a Michelin-starred restaurant in Saint-Mathieu-du-Parc, Quebec, Canada. Samy Benabed is the chef and a co-owner.

== See also ==
- List of Michelin-starred restaurants in Quebec
