= Narval (restaurant) =

Restaurant in Rimouski, Quebec, Canada

- Interactive map of Narval

Restaurant information
- Location: Rimouski, Quebec, Canada
- Coordinates: 48.4508°N 68.5268°W

Narval is a Michelin-starred restaurant in Rimouski, Quebec, Canada.

== See also ==
- List of Michelin-starred restaurants in Quebec
