= Sabayon (restaurant) =

Restaurant in Montreal, Quebec, Canada

- Interactive map of Sabayon

Restaurant information
- Established: August 1, 2023
- Owners: Marie-Josée Beaudoin; Patrice Demers
- Head chef: Patrice Demers
- Food type: Contemporary
- Rating: (Michelin Guide)
- Location: 2194 Centre St, Montreal, Quebec, Canada
- Coordinates: 45.4806°N 73.5656°W
- Seating capacity: 14
- Website: sabayon.ca

Sabayon is a Michelin-starred restaurant in Montreal, Quebec, Canada.

== Recognition ==
In 2025, the restaurant received a Michelin star in Quebec's inaugural Michelin Guide. In particular, Michelin praised the skills of chef Patrice Demers, whose previous experience working in a pâtisserie being now used in the cooking of the restaurant. Michelin also highlighted the restaurant's focus on fruits and vegetables in its cooking, with very little meat integrated into the dishes.

Sabayon topped Air Canada's annual list of 10 best new restaurants in Canada in 2024.

The restaurant placed on North America's 50 Best Restaurants list in 2026, ranking #34.

=== Canada's 100 Best Restaurants Ranking ===
The restaurant has appeared on Canada's 100 Best Restaurants ranking annually since debuting on the list in 2024. Sabayon is placed #44 as of the latest ranking in the 2026 edition.

Sabayon
Year	Rank	Change
2024	79	new
2025	48	▲31
2026	44	▲4

== See also ==
- List of Michelin-starred restaurants in Quebec
