= Judy Rodgers =

American chef, restaurateur, writer (1956–2013)

- Born: October 28, 1956; St. Louis, Missouri, United States
- Died: December 2, 2013 (aged 57); Berkeley, California, United States
- Education: Stanford University
- Culinary career
- Previous restaurant(s): Zuni Café, San Francisco, California (1987–2013)
- Award(s) won: * (2004) James Beard Foundation, "Outstanding Chef"

Judy Rodgers (October 28, 1956 – December 2, 2013) was an American chef, restaurateur, and cookbook writer. She became famous at Zuni Café, in San Francisco, California, of which she became chef in 1987. Rodgers' food was influenced both by Chez Panisse, where she had worked, and by the food of France, where she had spent time as an exchange student living with the family of Jean Troisgros. The Zuni Café Cookbook, published in 2002, spread the influence of her painstaking, attentive approach to food further outside the United States.

== Early life ==
Rodgers was born on October 28, 1956, in St Louis, Missouri. Her "education in cooking" began in 1973 when a family friend arranged for her to spend a year as an exchange student with Jean Troisgros. Troisgros' family restaurant, Les Frères Troisgros, held three Michelin stars and had been described by Christian Millau in the magazine Gault-Millau as the best restaurant in the world. Rodgers took notes of what she ate and how it was cooked. In 1974, she moved to California to attend Stanford University, where she majored in art history.

== Career ==
Towards the end of Rodgers' time at Stanford, a friend introduced her to Alice Waters' Berkeley restaurant, Chez Panisse, where she rapidly graduated to taking single-handed charge of lunch service. Waters' stress on the importance of eating food in its season was shared to the full by Rodgers. Her style was further influenced by the books of Richard Olney, Elizabeth David and Waverley Root and a French apprenticeship with Pepette Arbulo of the restaurant l'Estanquet in Les Landes. Later visits to Italy also helped form her taste and style.

On returning to the United States, Rodgers worked for Marion Cunningham, cooking "homey, American fare" at the Union Hotel in Benicia, California. One of the dishes on the menu was Caesar salad, a "benchmark version" of which was to become a permanent fixture on the menu of Zuni Café.

In 1987, Rodgers was asked by the two owners of a Mexican café, Zuni Café, on Market Street in San Francisco to become its chef. Shortly after her arrival, a brick oven was constructed in the middle of the dining room and Rodgers' famous roasted chicken for two with its accompanying bread salad soon joined the Caesar salad as one of the restaurant's standards.

The Zuni Cafe Cookbook: A Compendium of Recipes and Cooking Lessons from San Francisco's Beloved Restaurant in which Rodgers' recipes and extensive instructions on the importance of tasting ingredients and dishes as they are being cooked were complemented by Gerald Asher's wine suggestions was published in 2002. After her death, Jonathan Gold described the book in the Los Angeles Times as "possibly the greatest, most generous cookbook ever written by a working American chef".

Rodgers died of cancer of the appendix at age 57, in 2013 in Berkeley, California. She was remembered in the New York Times as creating a dining experience that "helped transform the way Americans think of food through its devotion to local, seasonal ingredients meticulously prepared."

== Awards ==
- James Beard Foundation, Outstanding Chef 2004
- James Beard Foundation, Cookbook of the Year 2003
- James Beard Foundation, Cooking from a Professional Point 2003
- James Beard Foundation, Restaurant of the Year 2003
- James Beard Foundation, Cookbook Hall of Fame 2022 for The Zuni Cafe Cookbook (awarded posthumously)
