= Zuni Café =

Restaurant in San Francisco, California

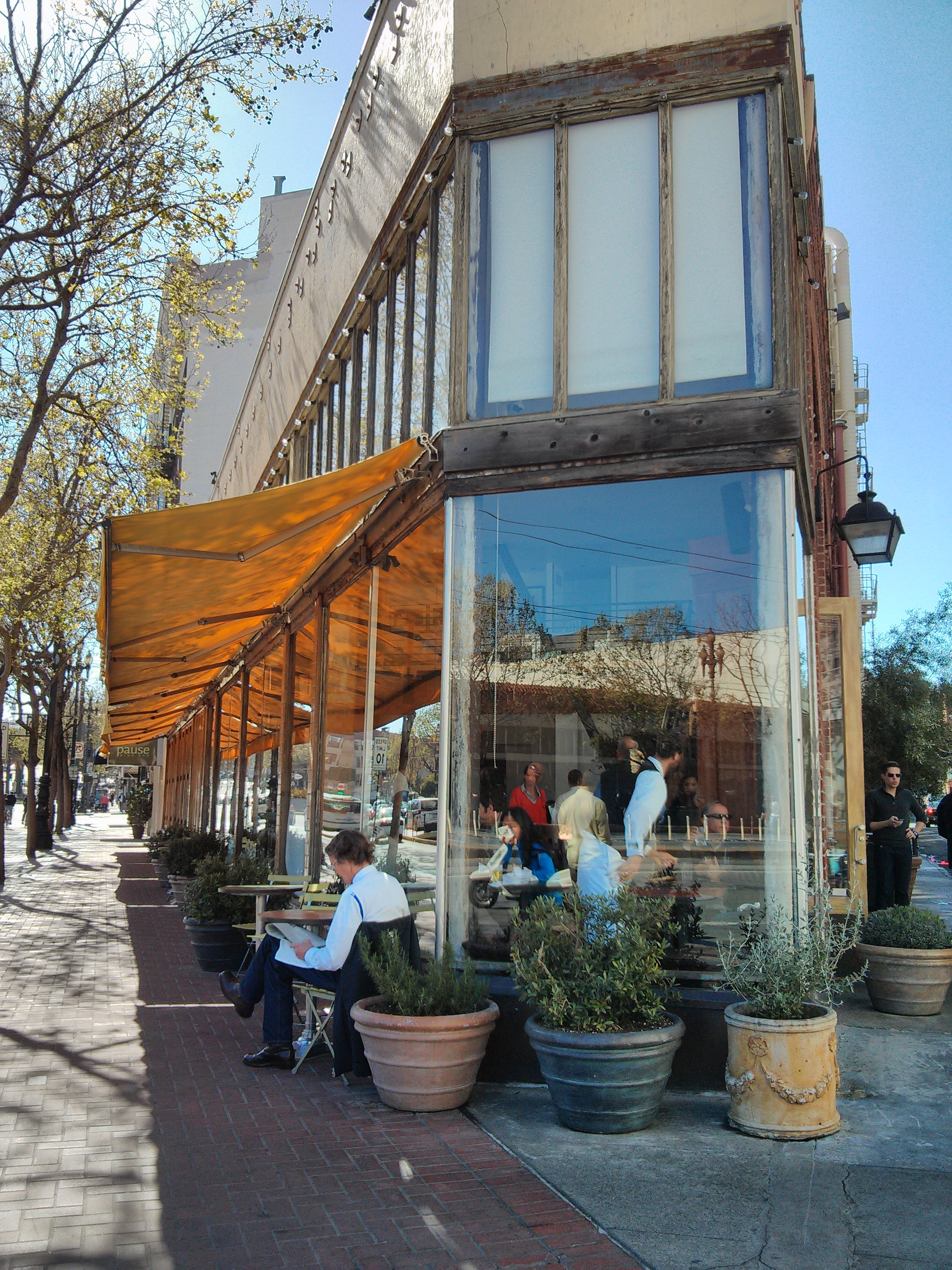
- Zuni Café
- Interactive map of Zuni Café

Restaurant information
- Established: 1979
- Owner: Gilbert Pilgram
- Head chef: Anne Alvero
- Food type: California seasonal; French; Italian
- Location: 1658 Market Street, San Francisco, California, 94102, United States
- Coordinates: 37.773656°N 122.421447°W
- Website: www.zunicafe.com

Zuni Café is a restaurant in San Francisco, California, named after the Zuni tribe of indigenous Pueblo peoples of Arizona and New Mexico. It occupies a triangular building on Market Street at the corner of Rose Street.

== History ==
Zuni Café was established in 1979 by Billy West. In 1981 he hired Vince Calcagno as the manager, who became a business partner in 1987. From its inception it was a gay gathering place. Originally there was little money or space for cooking equipment: West grilled steaks illegally in the alley on a Weber grill. After a recommendation from Elizabeth David, Zuni Café became popular, and in 1984 Patricia Unterman wrote in a San Francisco Chronicle review: "The open kitchen at last has stoves, grills, counters, and refrigeration. ...There's enough money in the bank to support a good wine list." West and Calcagno hired Judy Rodgers (formerly of Chez Panisse) as head chef in 1987. Calcagno and Rodgers became co-owners; West died in July 1994.

Originally a Southwest-themed café, Zuni Café expanded in the 1980s into the adjacent space that had been a cactus shop, and under Rodgers came to serve primarily Italian- and French-inspired cuisine. With her at the helm, Zuni Café won the James Beard Foundation Award for "Best Chef: Pacific" in 2000, "Outstanding Restaurant" in 2003, and "Outstanding Chef" in 2004. Rodgers published The Zuni Café Cookbook in 2002.

Gilbert Pilgram, also formerly of Chez Panisse, became the co-owner when Calcagno retired in 2006. Rodgers died on December 2, 2013. Subsequently the head chef was Nate Norris, who was succeeded in October 2022 by Anne Alvero. In 2018, the restaurant received the James Beard Award for Outstanding Service.

On reopening in 2021 after the COVID-19 shutdown, Zuni Café replaced tips with a service charge for diners, applied to the pay of back-of-house workers as well as servers. A San Francisco Chronicle review in 2024 noted that most long-term servers had chosen not to return because of the resulting reduction in their income, and that as a result service was now more uneven.

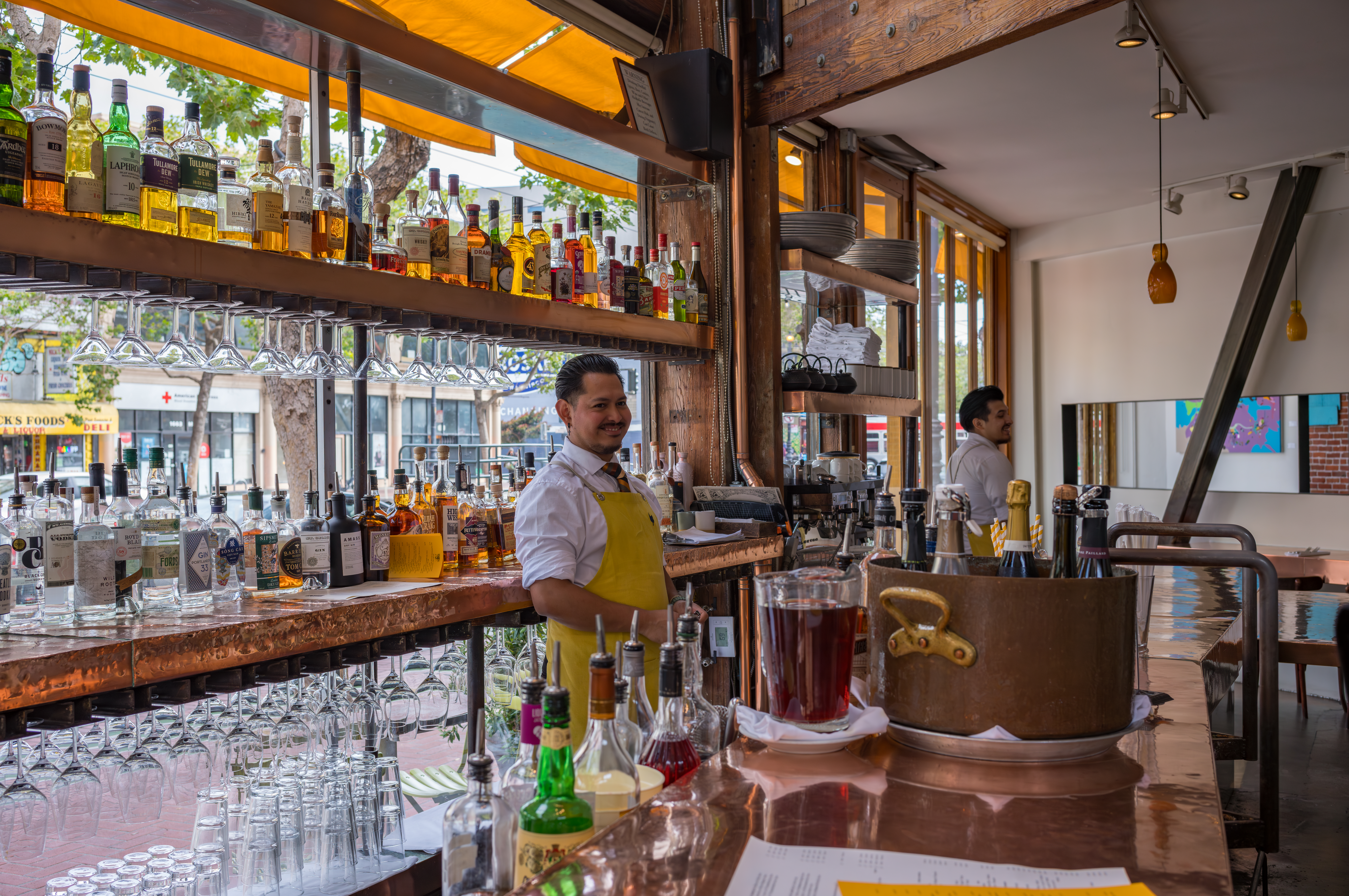
Bar at Zuni Café

With gay artist George "Bubba" Geiger, West made the original furniture for Zuni Café, using mesquite trunks and slabs of wood. The restaurant has a piano and a changing exhibition of modern art, both instituted by West. West also added a Parisian-inspired copper bar; since there are no bar stools, Rodgers had a metal rod added for people to prop a foot on. Rodgers also designed the brick oven, used for roasting chicken over wood. The building underwent a seismic retrofit in 1991, when the interior was given exposed ceiling beams.

The restaurant has a secret menu.
