= Laurie Raphaël =

Restaurant in Quebec City, Canada

- Interactive map of Laurie Raphaël

Restaurant information
- Established: 1991
- Owners: Suzanne Gagnon; Daniel Vezina
- Head chef: Raphaël Vezina
- Food type: Modern
- Rating: (Michelin Guide)
- Location: 117 rue Dalhousie, Quebec City, Quebec, Canada
- Coordinates: 46.817°N 71.2026°W
- Website: laurieraphael.com

Laurie Raphaël is a Michelin-starred restaurant in Quebec City, Canada.

== History ==
The business was opened in 1991 by couple Suzanne Gagnon and Daniel Vezina, with the latter serving as the restaurant's chef.

In 2012, the couple's son, Raphaël Vezina, took over as the head chef.

A second location of the restaurant previously operated in Montreal, but closed in July 2019.

== Recognition ==
In 2025, the restaurant received a Michelin star in Quebec's inaugural Michelin Guide.

== See also ==
- List of Michelin-starred restaurants in Quebec
