= Wine list =

Type of menu

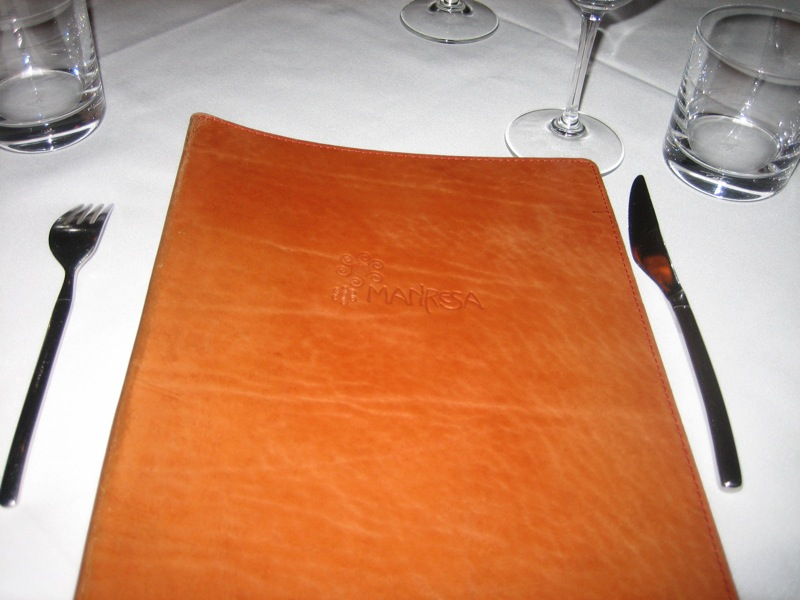
The exterior of a restaurant's wine list

A wine list is a menu of wine selections for purchase, typically in a restaurant setting. A restaurant may include a list of available wines on its main menu, but usually provides a separate menu just for wines. Wine lists in the form of tasting menus and wines for purchase are also offered by wineries and wine stores.

A restaurant's sommelier is usually in charge of assembling the wine list, educating the staff about wine, and assisting customers with their wine selections.

Wine lists have been found from ancient Egyptian times. Ancient wine lists were not created for the same purpose served by a menu, but rather as a means of recording inventory and administering wine rations in a monarch's household.

== Organization ==
A wine list is typically organized into sections. A restaurant offering few selections may organize its list in two groups (red wine and white wine) whereas a larger wine list may have several sections, including any of the following:

- White wines
- Red wines
- Rosé wines
- Dessert wines
- Sections or subcategories by varietal
- Sections organized by wine-producing region or country
- Locally produced or specialty wines

== Pricing ==
Next to the description of each wine selection, a wine list displays the price of wine purchased by the bottle or by the glass. Typically a restaurant sets the price of a single glass of wine to recover its purchase cost on the entire bottle. The industry average price markup for bottles of wine ranges from 2.5–3 times the establishment's wholesale cost.

A wine list may also disclose a corkage fee for patrons who bring their own wine, in establishments and countries where this is customary. The corkage fee is intended to cover the profit the restaurant would have earned had it sold the customer a wine.

== Format ==
Wine lists have traditionally been implemented in paper, usually protected by some kind of cover like the ones seen on the normal restaurant menus. This kind of implementation usually leads to some entries being unavailable due to stock issues, since business owners are unlikely to change the wine list daily.

Recently, a growing trend in the restaurant industry has been to adopt digital wine lists, presenting them to patrons on tablets and similar devices. Besides the efficiency gains on running the restaurant's wine list, these digital devices are able to monitor the patron's behavior and preferences, allowing restaurant managers and sommeliers to access deep insight about their customer, pricing impact, and other factors.
