= Tasting menu =

Collection of several dishes in small portions served as a single meal

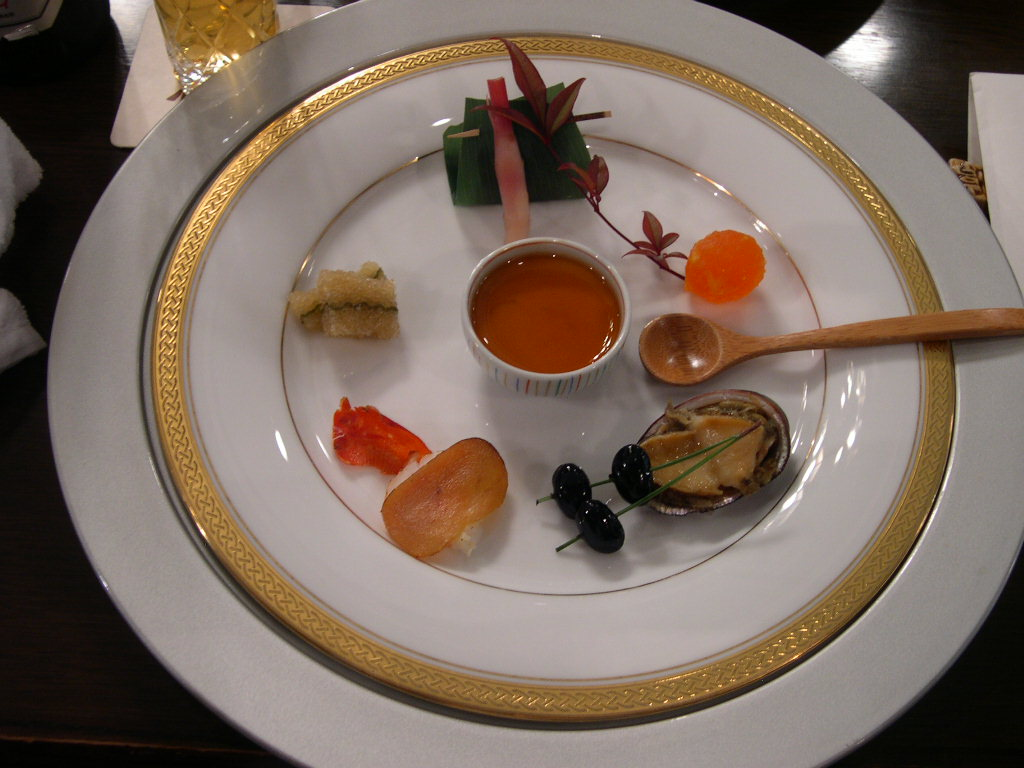
The first course of a tasting menu in Ginza, Tokyo

A tasting menu is a collection of several dishes in small portions, served by a restaurant as a single meal. The French name for a tasting menu is menu dégustation. Some restaurants and chefs specialize in tasting menus, while in other cases, it is a special or a menu option. Tasting menus may be offered to provide a sample of a type of cuisine, a house specialty, or to take advantage of fresh seasonal ingredients.

Coming to the mainstream in the 1990s, tasting menus evolved into elaborate showcases highlighting the culinary artistry of the chef. The trend traces back centuries, but some trace the latest evolution to the mid-1990s and two highly lauded restaurants, Chef Ferran Adrià's El Bulli in Spain, and Chef Thomas Keller's French Laundry in Napa Valley, north of San Francisco in the U.S., that offered tasting menus of 40 courses or more. Tasting menus have since become increasingly popular, to the point where, in 2013, New York Times food critic Pete Wells noted, "Across the country, expensive tasting-menu-only restaurants are spreading like an epidemic."

== See also ==
- Degustation
- Omakase
- Pu pu platter
- Service à la française
- Service à la russe
- Prix fixe
