= Bar Raval =

Restaurant in Toronto, Ontario, Canada

- Interactive map of Bar Raval

Restaurant information
- Established: February 13, 2015
- Owner: Grant van Gameren
- Food type: Spanish
- Rating: Bib Gourmand (Michelin Guide)
- Location: 505 College Street, Toronto, Ontario, Canada
- Coordinates: 43.6558305°N 79.4099240°W
- Seating capacity: 40
- Website: www.thisisbarraval.com

Bar Raval is a Spanish tapas restaurant and cocktail bar in the Little Italy neighbourhood of Toronto, Ontario, Canada.

The restaurant is owned by Toronto restauranteur Grant Van Gameren, who is also the owner and former head chef of Toronto Michelin-starred restaurant Quetzal.

== Design ==
Bar Raval is well known for its interior, designed by local Toronto-based architectural firm Partisans. Van Gameren cited wanting the restaurant to be "as much an art piece as a restaurant." The bar is built in Spanish Art Nouveau style, with wooden curved accents and South African mahogany woodwork wrapping above, around, and on the entire bar.

The restaurant only offers a limited seating area, encouraging its patrons to instead stand or lean against the bar. In the evenings, the restaurant is standing-room only.

== Food and drink ==
Bar Raval seeks to emulate a Barcelona-style tapas bar, offering a small food menu of Spanish bar snacks such as conservas (canned fish and seafood) and pintxos (food served on toothpicks).

The restaurant offers Spanish wines, as well as a large selection of sherry and vermouth. The signature cocktail at the bar is the Tinto Fino, which consists of dry sherry and lime juice.

== Recognition ==
Canada's 50 Best Bars Ranking

Bar Raval
Year	Rank	Change
2018	1	new
2019	1	Steady
2020	1	Steady
2021	No List	
2022	8	▼7
2023	6	▲2
2024	25	▼19
2025	29	▼4
2026	10	▲19

The business was named a Bib Gourmand restaurant by the Michelin Guide at Toronto's 2022 Michelin Guide ceremony, and has retained this recognition each year following. A Bib Gourmand recognition is awarded to restaurants who offer "exceptionally good food at moderate prices." Notable dishes Michelin cited in their review include Bar Raval's Boquerones en vinagre and shrimp a la planxa.

Bar Raval was ranked #1 on Canada's 50 Best Bars inaugural list in 2018, and retained its spot at the top of the list in 2019 and 2020. It has remained on the list every year following, most recently ranking at #10 in the 2026 edition.

It has also received global recognition, ranking #99 on the World's Best Bars list in 2020.

== See also ==
- List of Michelin Bib Gourmand restaurants in Canada
