= Neurogastronomy =

Study of flavor perception and how it affects cognition and memory

Neurogastronomy is the study of flavor perception and the ways it affects cognition and memory. This interdisciplinary field is influenced by the psychology and neuroscience of sensation, learning, satiety, and decision making. Areas of interest include how olfaction contributes to flavor, food addiction and obesity, taste preferences, and the linguistics of communicating and identifying flavor. The term neurogastronomy was coined by neuroscientist Gordon M. Shepherd.

== Olfaction and flavor ==
Human olfactory system. 1: Olfactory bulb 2: Mitral cells 3: Bone 4: Nasal epithelium 5: Glomerulus 6: Olfactory receptor neurons

Out of all the sensory modalities, olfaction contributes most to the sensation and perception of flavor processing. Olfaction has two sensory modalities, orthonasal smell, the detection of odor molecules originating outside the body, and retronasal smell, the detection of odor molecules originating during mastication. It is retronasal smell, whose sensation is felt in the mouth, that contributes to flavor perception. Anthropologically, over human evolution, the shortening of the nasopharynx and other shifts in bone structure suggest a constant improvement of flavor perception capabilities.

After mastication, odor molecules travel through the back of the mouth and up the nasopharynx. The odorants are detected by myriad receptors on the olfactory epithelium. These receptors respond to a variety of dimensions of chemical properties. Odor receptors that respond to a dimension within a molecular receptive range are aggregated by glomeruli in the olfactory bulb. Here, the multi-dimensional nature of odorant stimuli is reduced to two dimensions. This input undergoes edge enhancement, increasing its signal-to-noise ratio by way of lateral inhibition due to mitral cells stemming from the glomerular layer.

This input then reaches the olfactory cortex. Here, Hebbian learning networks allow for recall with partial or weak stimuli, indicating the first stage of conscious perception. Here, connections with the hypothalamus and hippocampus indicate that olfaction stimuli affect emotion, decision making, and learning only after significant processing and rudimentary identification.

== Decision making ==
The hedonic value of food and its decision making relies on several concurrent neural processes. The attentional drive to seek and consume food is modulated by homeostatic signaling of hunger and satiety. Habit, social interactions, and nutritional needs affect this signaling. Analysis of non-human primates' orbitofrontal cortex suggests decision making is additionally modulated by food identification, independent of hunger. Activity in the medial orbitofrontal cortex and anterior singulate suggest that an affective value is assigned to every food identification. Hedonic pleasure increases when engaging with food consumption and peaks during satiety. Impairments in these systems greatly impact the ability to resist the urge to eat. Imaging studies show that obese subjects with impairment in dopamine circuits that regulate hedonic value have issues with reward sensitivity and resist functional homeostatic signals that normally would prevent overeating.

The consumption of comfort foods can facilitate feelings of relational connection and belonging, and the motivation behind pursuing certain foods can be modulated by social context and environment.

Although the consumption of spicy food can cause pain, people in many cultures ascribe a high hedonic value to it. Psychologist Paul Rozin puts forth the idea of "benign masochism", a learned tendency that overrides the typically aversive stimuli because of the risk-taking or thrill-seeking associated with overcoming pain.

== Learned flavor preferences ==
Learned taste preferences develop as early as in utero, where the fetus is exposed to flavors through amniotic fluid. Early, innate, preferences exhibit tendencies towards calorie and protein dense foods. As children grow older, more factors such as peers, repeated exposures, environments and food availability will modulate taste preferences.

== Describing odors ==
While naming a flavor or food refines its representation strengthens its recall in memory, the patterns and tendencies in word choice to describe flavor suggests limits to the our perception and communication. In describing the flavor of wine, tasters tend to use words that function as a combination of visual and texture descriptors, and references to objects with similar odorant profiles. Color perception heavily influences the word choice describing a flavor; the color of word's semantic reference is often congruent with the food's color when the taster can see the food.

== Clinical and other academic translations ==
With neurogastronomy's roots in neuroscience and psychology, clinical translation into research in obesity, diabetes, hypertension, eating disorders, chemoreceptive deficits in cancer treatments, etc. are explored in clinical neurogastronomy. The term clinical neurogastronomy was coined by neuropsychologist Dan Han, to advocate for quality of life issues and positive clinical outcomes in patient populations. In 2015, Gordon M. Shepherd, Dan Han, Frédéric Morin, Tim McClintock, Bob Perry, Charles Spence, Jehangir Mehta, Kelsey Rahenkamp, Siddharth Kapoor, Ouita Michel, and Bret Smith formed the International Society of Neurogastronomy (ISN). ISN is sponsored by the National Institutes of Health. The inaugural meeting addressed multiple aspects of neurogastronomy concepts, and focused on its clinical translation including quality of life issues in cancer treatment and related smell and taste deficits, then followed by application into treatments for diabetes. Additional translational efforts included food technology, agriculture, climate change, and culinary arts.
