= Trese Leinders-Zufall =

Researcher

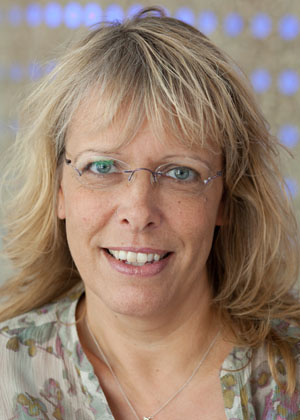
- Trese Leinders-Zufall
- Born: Trese Leinders
- Scientific career
- Thesis: Effects of divalent cations on calcium-activated potassium channels (1992)

Trese Leinders-Zufall née Leinders (born January 19, 1963) is a Dutch physiologist and professor at the Center for Integrative Physiology and Molecular Medicine at the Saarland University, Germany. She is a faculty member in the Department of Physiology at the Faculty of Medicine. She is known for her research investigating the olfactory system. Her work focuses on the mechanisms of odor and pathogen perception, the neural pathways that mediate olfactory-encoded social behaviors, and the function of TRP channels in the neurons of the olfactory, respiratory, and central nervous systems.

== Education and career ==
Leinders-Zufall received her first training in Biology at the Utrecht University in the Netherlands, and earned her degree in 1992. She was a postdoctoral fellow and later an associate research scientist at Yale University from 1992 until 1997 in the Department of Neurology (Stephen G. Waxman) and the Department of Neurobiology (Gordon M. Shepherd). Leinders-Zufall accepted a position of assistant professor at University of Maryland, Baltimore in 1997, and was promoted to associate professor in 2002. In 2008 she received an endowed Lichtenberg Professorship from the Volkswagen Foundation in Germany, and accepted a full professorship at the Department of Physiology, Saarland University, Campus Homburg, where the School of Medicine is located. This endowed professorship has allowed her to establish an internationally recognized research program in Germany, positioned at the interface between the nervous-, endocrine- and immune systems.

== Research ==
Leinders-Zufall is known for her work on olfactory systems, neural pathways mediating olfactory-encoded innate social behaviors, and investigations into various TRP channel subtypes. Early in her career, she studied calcium-activated potassium channels.

Leinders-Zufall mainly studies the basic molecular and cellular processes that allow animals to communicate through chemicals. She studies the mechanisms that control complex behaviors, such as aggression, parental care, and reproduction. Her main focus is on signal transduction cascades and ion channels that are controlled by second messengers. She uses many different advanced methods in electrophysiology, calcium imaging, and photopharmacology.

A series of fundamental studies of odor transduction was produced by the combined effort of Gordon M. Shepherd, Stuart Firestein, Frank Zufall, Charles A. Greer and Trese Leinders-Zufall: "This included inhibition of the CNG channels by intracellular calcium, and modulation of the CNG channels by carbon monoxide and by cyclic GMP." Then, Leinders-Zufall went on to identify odor-induced calcium transients in single olfactory cilia. Leinders-Zufall's research has contributed significantly to our understanding of the mechanisms underlying chemosensation (exteroception) and interoception, and of the connections between these mechanisms and the nervous system.

== Awards and honors ==
- Erasmus-stipend, European Community (NUFFIC) (1988)
- Takasago Award for Research in Olfaction (2002)
- Endowed Lichtenberg Professorship (Volkswagen Foundation, Hannover, Germany) (2007)

== Key papers ==
- Leinders-Zufall, Trese; Greer, Charles A.; Shepherd, Gordon M.; Zufall, Frank (1998-08-1) "Imaging odor-induced calcium transients in single olfactory cilia: specificity of activation and role in transduction". J Neurosci. 18 (15):5630-9. PMID 9671654 doi:10.1523/JNEUROSCI.18-15-05630.1998
- Leinders-Zufall, Trese; Lane, Andrew P.; Puche, Adam C.; Ma, Weidong; Novotny, Milos V.; Shipley, Michael T.; Zufall, Frank (2000-06-15). "Ultrasensitive pheromone detection by mammalian vomeronasal neurons". Nature. 405 (6788): 792–796. Bibcode:2000Natur.405..792L. doi:10.1038/35015572. ISSN 0028-0836. PMID 10866200.
- Leypold, Bradley G.; Yu, C. Ron; Leinders-Zufall, Trese; Kim Michelle M.; Zufall, Frank; Axel, Richard (2002-04-23) Altered sexual and social behaviors in trp2 mutant mice. Proc Natl Acad Sci U S A. 99 (9):6376-81. PMID 11972034 DOI:10.1073/pnas.082127599
- Müller, Markus; Niemeyer, Konstantin; Ojha, Navin K.; Porav, Sebastian A.; Vinayagam, Deivanayagabarathy.; Urban, Nicole; Büchau, Fanny; Oleinikov, Katharina; Makke, Mazze; Bauer, Claudia C.; Johnson, Aidan V.; Muench, Stephen P.; Zufall, Frank; Bruns, Dieter; Schwarz, Yvonne; Raunser, Stefan; Leinders-Zufall, Trese; Bon, Robin S.; Schaefer, Michael; Thorn-Seshold, Oliver (2026-01-16) Ideal efficacy photoswitches for chemocontrol of TRPC4/5 channel functions in live tissues. Nature Chem Biol. 22 (2):180-191. PMID 41545580 doi:10.1038/s41589-025-02085-x
