= Restaurant 20 Victoria =

Restaurant in Toronto, Ontario, Canada

- Interactive map of Restaurant 20 Victoria

Restaurant information
- Established: June 1, 2021
- Owner: Chris White
- Head chef: Rafael Covarrubias
- Food type: Contemporary; seafood
- Rating: (Michelin Guide)
- Location: 20 Victoria Street, Toronto, Ontario, M5C 2A1, Canada
- Coordinates: 43°39′0.2″N 79°22′37.7″W
- Seating capacity: 24

Restaurant 20 Victoria is a restaurant in Downtown Toronto, Ontario, Canada.

== History ==
Restaurant 20 Victoria was opened in 2021 by Chris White, following the expiry of the lease of his Toronto restaurant Brothers Food & Wine. Starting operations during the COVID-19 pandemic, the restaurant initially offered only sidewalk seating due to indoor dining restrictions in place in Ontario.

The restaurant is named after the street address it operates from, 20 Victoria Street.

From the restaurant's opening until the end of 2025, the kitchen was led by chef Julie Hyde, who is also formerly of Brothers Food & Wine. Hyde announced her departure from the restaurant as of January 2026, being replaced by Rafael Covarrubias of fellow Toronto-area Michelin-starred restaurant Hexagon.

== Concept ==
It offers a seven-course tasting menu in its dining room, as well as an à la carte menu offered from its bar seating that faces the open kitchen.

The business is a no-tipping restaurant and service is included in the bill.

== Recognition ==
The restaurant received a Michelin star in Toronto's 2023 edition of the Michelin Guide, recognizing its "pristine seafood and refined sauce work." Until the departure of chef Hyde at the end of 2025, it was the only Michelin-starred establishment in Toronto headed exclusively by a female chef. 20 Victoria retained its star in the 2024 and 2025 guides.

20 Victoria was also recognized with the 'Best Service' award at the 2023 Toronto Michelin award ceremony.

The restaurant was ranked #4 in Canada's 100 Best Restaurants list in 2024. It also topped Air Canada's annual list of best new restaurants in Canada in 2022.

=== Canada's 100 Best Restaurants Ranking ===
Restaurant 20 Victoria
Year	Rank	Change
2022	64	new
2023	11	▲53
2024	4	▲7
2025	5	▼1
2026	10	▼5

== See also ==
- List of Michelin-starred restaurants in Toronto
- List of seafood restaurants
