= Mon Lapin =

Restaurant and wine bar in Montreal, Quebec, Canada

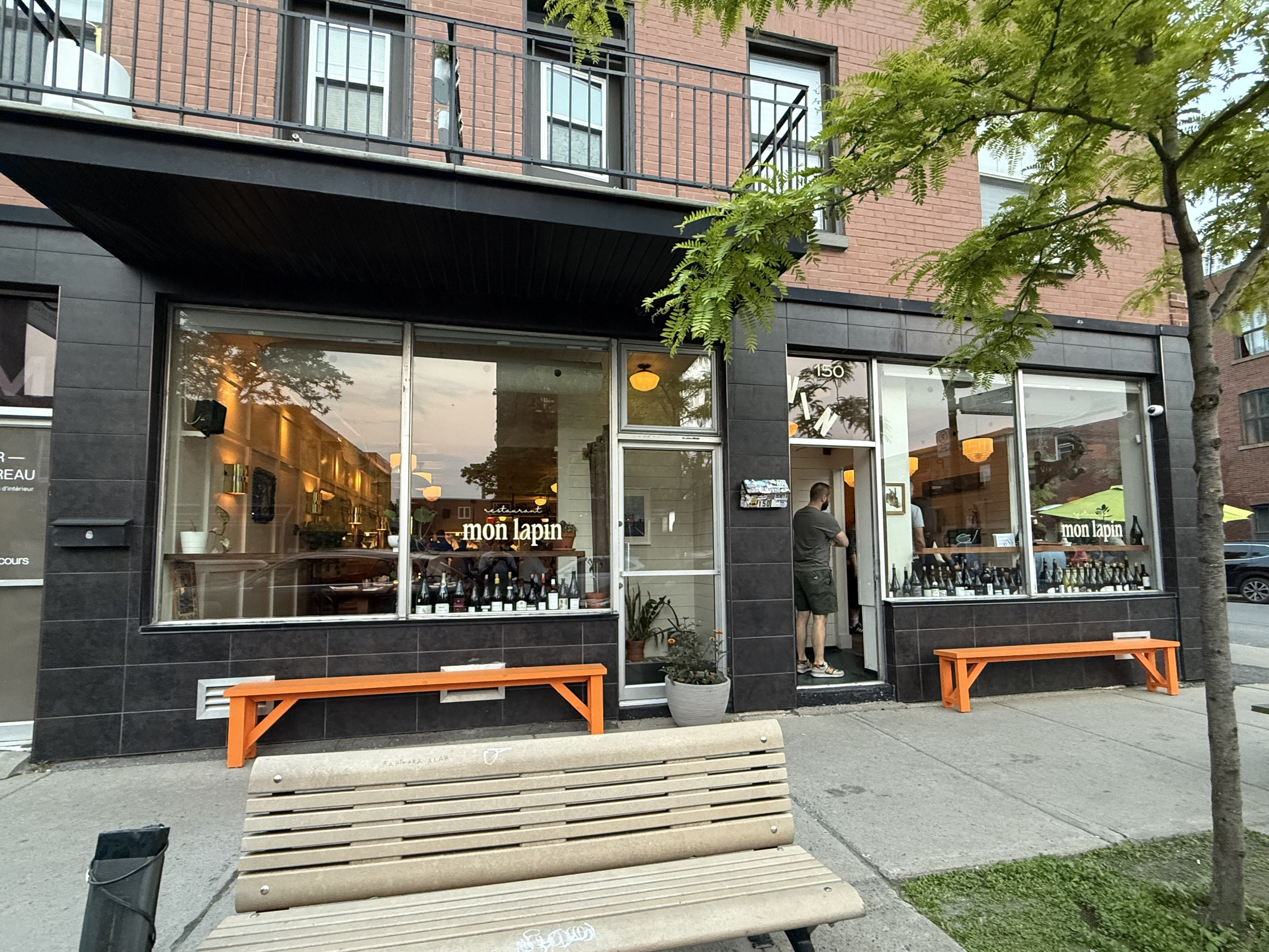
- Exterior of Mon Lapin
- Interactive map of Mon Lapin

Restaurant information
- Established: March 1, 2018
- Owners: Vanya Filipovic; Marc-Olivier Frappier
- Head chef: Jessica Noel
- Food type: French
- Rating: Recommended (Michelin Guide)
- Location: 150 Rue Saint-Zotique Est, Montreal, Quebec, Canada
- Coordinates: 45°31′59″N 73°36′38″W
- Website: vinmonlapin.com

Mon Lapin (also referred to as: Vin Mon Lapin) is a restaurant and wine bar in the Rosemont–La Petite-Patrie borough of Montreal, Quebec, Canada.

== History ==
Mon Lapin opened in 2018, originally under the ownership of the Joe Beef restaurant group.

In December 2019, the restaurant was purchased by husband-and-wife couple Vanya Filipovic and Marc-Olivier Frappier, who were employees of the Joe Beef group. Prior to the purchase, Filipovic was already serving as the restaurant's head sommelier and Frappier was heading the kitchen, and they retained these roles following taking on ownership. Jessica Noel has also served as the restaurant's co-head chef since its opening.

In late 2020, the business purchased its neighbouring storefront to expand the size of the restaurant, doubling its seating capacity.

The Mon Lapin team also operate a casual rotisserie-focused restaurant down the street, Rôtisserie La Lune. In 2025, La Lune was recognized with a Michelin Bib Gourmand designation for offering "exceptionally good food at moderate prices" in Quebec's inaugural Michelin Guide.

== Concept ==
At opening, the restaurant owners sought to serve "unpretentious, cottage-inspired dining", complimented with a comprehensive natural wine list. Then-owner David McMillan of Joe Beef initially stated wanting Mon Lapin's cuisine and style to evolve based on what the surrounding neighbourhood's patrons were looking for.

The restaurant does not have a static menu, with its dishes often being swapped out or changed on a daily basis.

== Recognition ==
In 2025, the business received a 'Recommended' designation in Quebec's inaugural Michelin Guide. Per the guide, a 'Recommended' selection "is the sign of a chef using quality ingredients that are well cooked; simply a good meal" and that the anonymous inspectors had found "the food to be above average, but not quite at [Michelin star] level."

In both 2025 and 2026, Time Out Magazine ranked Mon Lapin as its number one restaurant in Montreal, praising the "carefully crafted dishes", wine list, and impeccable service.

Condé Nast magazine praised the vibe of the restaurant, stating the feeling of "like you're in someone's personal kitchen", while also highlighting its "farm-fresh, veggie-forward" dishes - including a sea urchin omelette, rabbit sausage, and fried oysters.

Reviewing the restaurant in May 2018, Montreal Gazette restaurant critic Maeve Haldane gave Mon Lapin 3 1/2 stars out of 4, citing its inventive, market-driven menu and natural wine offerings. She described the space as warm and lively, with personable staff, refined dishes, and wine that was “intriguing and lovely to drink.”

Mon Lapin was ranked #2 in the inaugural North America's 50 Best Restaurants list published in September 2025, while also being the highest ranked Canadian restaurant. It ranked #5 in the 2026 publication of the list. Mon Lapin has also made The World's 50 Best Restaurants Discovery section - which highlights restaurants and bars which are not ranked on the list but are still considered worth visiting. The list lauded the exceptional wine knowledge of the staff in making recommendations of pairings with each of the dishes served.

=== Canada's 100 Best Restaurants ranking ===
The restaurant has appeared on Canada's 100 Best Restaurants list annually since its opening. In 2023, the restaurant was ranked #1 in Canada, becoming the first Quebec restaurant to top the list since Toqué! in 2016. The restaurant retained its placing at the top of the list in 2024 before falling to #2 in 2025.

Mon Lapin
Year	Rank	Change
2019	50	new
2020	21	▲29
2021	No List	
2022	6	▲15
2023	1	▲5
2024	1	Steady
2025	2	▼1
2026	2	Steady

== Gallery ==
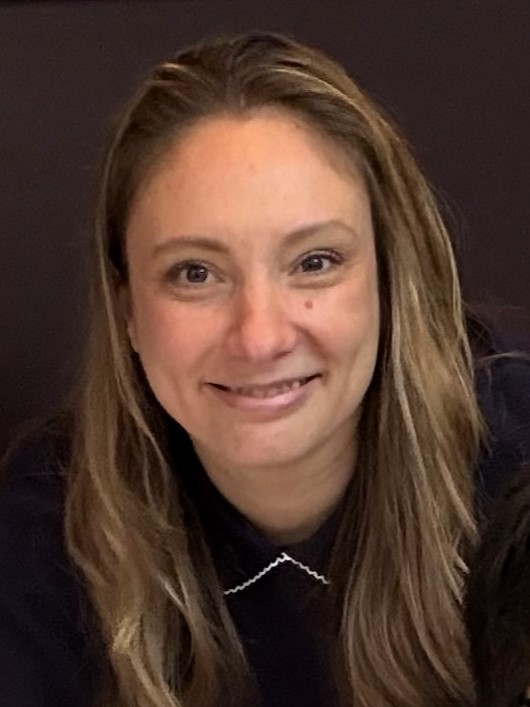
Vanya Filipovic, co-owner

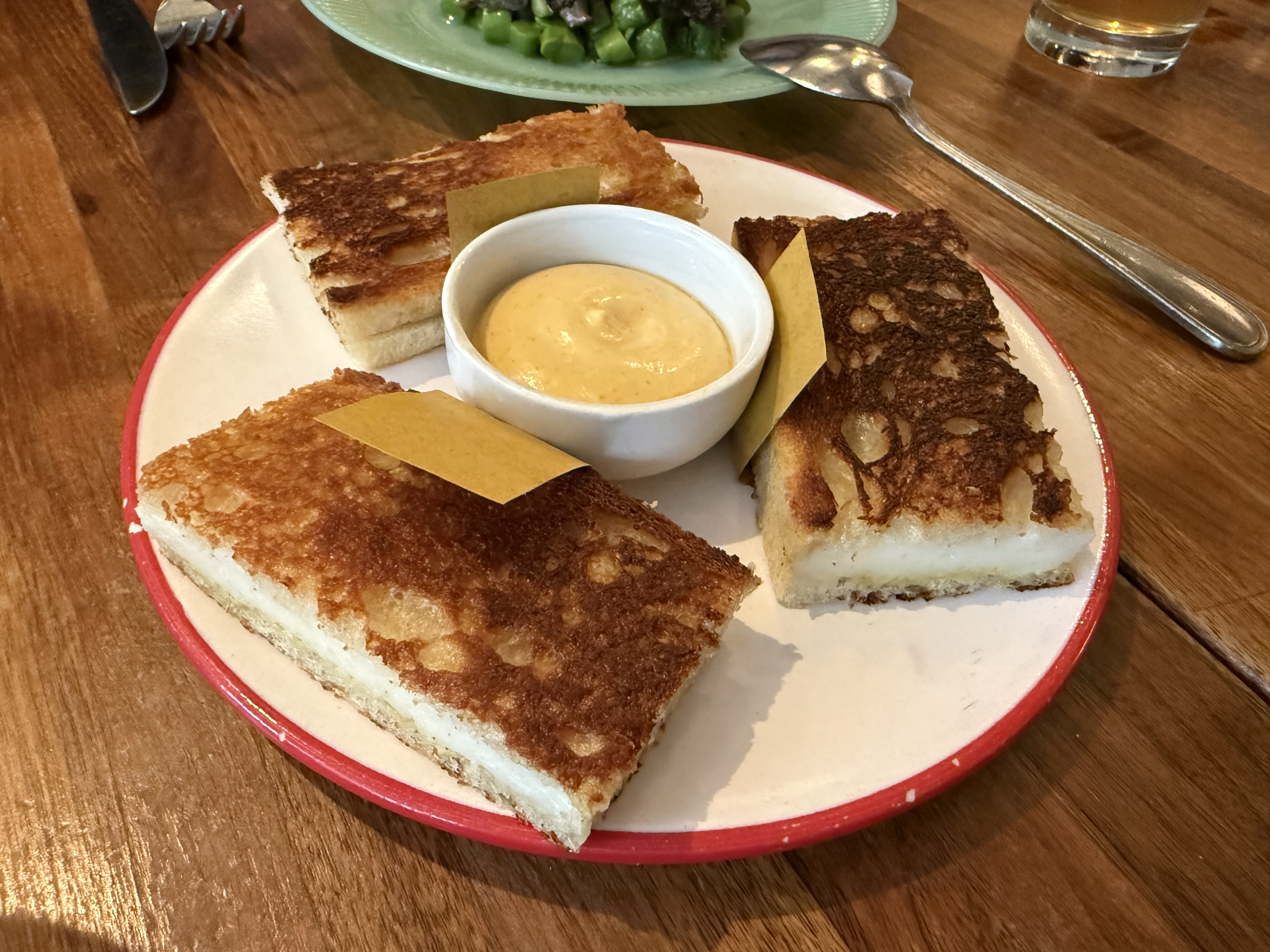
Le croque-pétoncle, rouille classique (scallop croque, classic rouille)

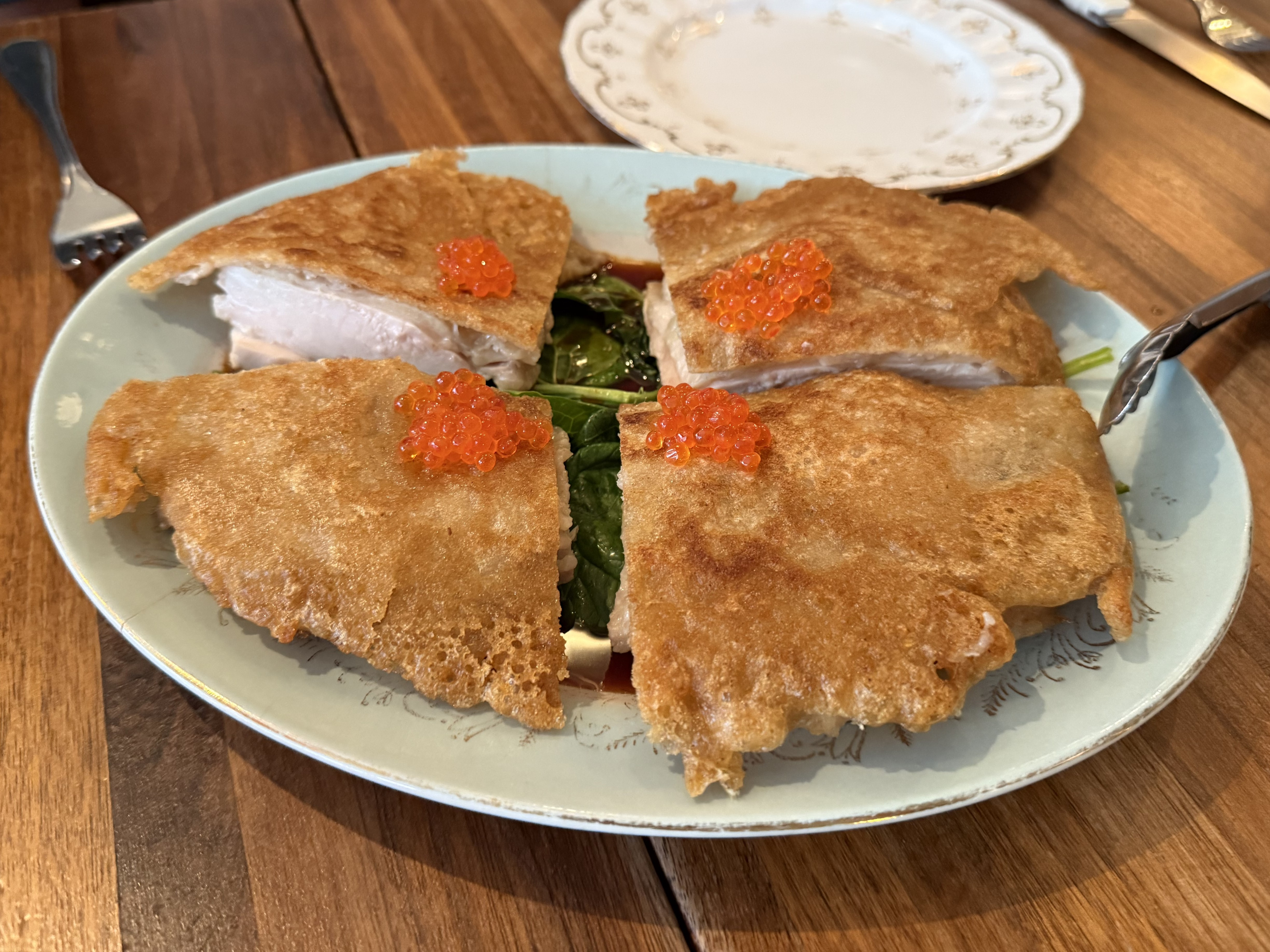
Volaille fermière au levain, caviar - épinards (rabbit and farmhouse chicken with sourdough, caviar and spinach)
