= Dan Han =

American neuroscientist and clinical psychologist

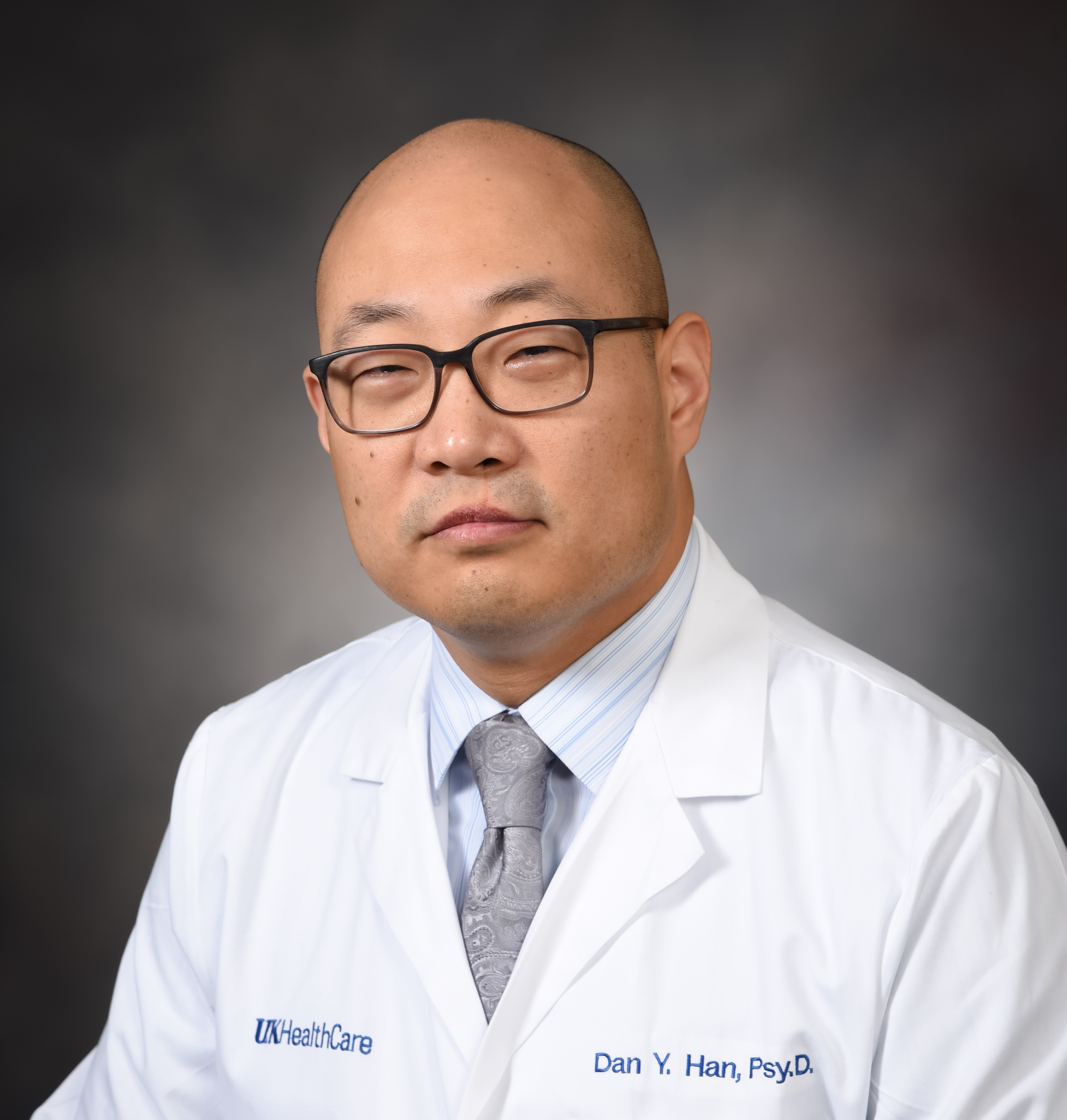
- Organization: University of Kentucky International Society of Neurogastronomy
- Known for: clinical neuroscience, clinical psychology, neuropsychology, neurogastronomy, neurotrauma

Dan Han is an American neuroscientist and clinical psychologist, who specializes in neuropsychology, neurotrauma, and neurogastronomy. He is one of the founders of the International Society of Neurogastronomy. He is a Fellow of the American Neurological Association, the Royal Society of Medicine, and of the Royal Society for Public Health. Han is currently a Professor of neurology, neurosurgery, and physical medicine & rehabilitation at the University of Kentucky College of Medicine.

== Career ==
Han trained in clinical psychology and neuropsychology at Loyola University Chicago, Adler University, University of Chicago, and Rush University, and then completed his fellowship at the Charles Matthews Neuropsychology Lab under Bruce Hermann at the University of Wisconsin School of Medicine and Public Health. After his training, he has been on faculty at the University of Kentucky College of Medicine, leading its neuropsychology division. In 2012, Han and Frédéric Morin conceptualized the inaugural symposium of the International Society of Neurogastronomy (ISN). Over the next subsequent years, Han, Morin, Gordon M. Shepherd, Tim McClintock, Bob Perry, Jehangir Mehta, Charles Spence, Kelsey Rahenkamp, Siddharth Kapoor, Ouita Michel, and Bret Smith formed ISN with sponsorship from the National Institute on Deafness and Other Communication Disorders/National Institutes of Health.

== Neurogastronomy ==
Neurogastronomy is the neuroscience of flavor perception in the brain, and as a neuropsychologist Han incorporated clinical variables into this field and coined the term clinical neurogastronomy. Han works with diverse academic and clinical professionals investigating smell, taste, and flavor mechanisms. Neurogastronomists aim to expand evidence-based approaches to promote human health, quality of life, clinical management, and related economics of food sustainability. Subsequently, Han introduced the concept of flavor economics as an application of neurogastronomy for global health and food sustainability. The interdisciplinary meetings of neurogastronomists via ISN were initially led by Han and his colleagues between 2015 and 2018. International efforts were fostered involving six countries, i.e., United States, Canada, England, Germany, Spain, and Japan. Olfaction, taste, cognitive, bioenergetics, and food technology scientists, clinicians, and culinary artisans annually participate in this intersection of neurogastronomy. Culinary involvement has included celebrity chefs from TV shows such as Top Chef, Parts Unknown, The Layover, and Bizarre Foods.

In 2015, Han created the Applied Neurogastronomy Challenge within ISN’s project events, which incorporates interdisciplinary teamwork to address dietetic and nutritional needs of clinical patient populations. This was lauded as a novel and innovative application of systems neuroscience and featured by media outlets in 16 countries, covered in 11 languages.

== Honors and awards ==
- 2021: Excellence in Medical Education Award - Category: Mentorship (formerly the Abraham Flexner Excellence in Medical Education Award), The Academy of Medical Educators
- 2020: Visionary Award, 150th Anniversary of Alfred Adler: 2020 Adlerian Summit
- 2019: Excellence in Medical Education Award - Category: Teaching (formerly the Abraham Flexner Excellence in Medical Education Award), The Academy of Medical Educators
- 2019: Psychologist of the Year Award, Kentucky Psychological Association
- 2017: Blavatnik Nominee for Life Sciences, The New York Academy of Sciences
- 2016: Excellence in Medical Education Award - Category: Leadership (formerly the Abraham Flexner Excellence in Medical Education Award), The Academy of Medical Educators
- 2016: Jack Runyon Award, Kentucky Psychological Association
- 2015: Founder's Recognition Award, International Society of Neurogastronomy
- 2014: Honor the Fallen Soldier Patriot Coin Medallion, Association of the United States Army – CPL Bill McMillan Chapter
