= Grotto Sauna =

General information
- Location: Georgian Bay, Ontario, Canada
- Completed: 2014
- Client: Private

Technical details
- Floor area: 75 m^{2} (810 sq ft)

Design and construction
- Architect: Partisans

The Grotto Sauna is a private sauna in Georgian Bay, Canada. The building is 75 m^{2} (810 sq ft) and consists of a singular room with two benches and two stoves, a large window looking onto the bay and a skylight. A waterside grotto is a subterranean chamber that is chapped and smoothed by receding water currents. The sauna is based directly on these waterside grottos.

The sauna was designed by Toronto-based architects, Partisans.

== Design ==
The site sits on Canadian shield rock formations and a few cubic meters were shaved/blasted off in order to place the sauna's concrete foundation. Twelve inch wide footings were fastened to the rock using 24 inch long rods.

== Technology ==
A Leica 3D-scanning device was used to collect 90 million data points after which the scan was processed using Autodesk ReCap and the site was then modeled and built using Rhinoceros and Grasshopper. This model allowed for off-site fabrication, which minimised the environmental impact of the construction.

== Material ==
The rectangular-shaped exterior is covered in approximately 280 locally sourced Northern white Cedar planks, square-cut and up to 15 feet long. It is attached to the cleating using adhesive resin, brad nails and screws. The exterior façade got its unique carbon color from a Japanese wood charring process known as shou sugi ban or yakisugi allowing it to blend in with the rock facades. On the otherwise curvilinear interior, the walls are lined with 117 wooden panels, CNC-milled (Computerized Numerical Control) by Millworks Custom Manufacturing (MCM) and held together by 11 gauge galvanized steel brackets, custom made to 8" by 4" square. "Cut from raw wood blocks up to 4 feet by 8 feet, the 7.5-inch-deep panels range from 10 inches square to 48 inches by 114 inches; the larger pieces were joined after milling."

CNC milling maximised the amount of wood available for the walls. The wood was cut along the grain so that every piece could match when assembled. To hold these panels together, custom 11- gauge galvanized 8" by 4" square steel brackets that were used. In order to survive the temperature changes in the site climate, a water-resistive barrier, DELTA®-FASSADE allows moisture vapor that gathers in the interior to escape. The window panes were made using double and triple glazed annealed glass.

== Awards ==
- AIA International Region Design Awards, April 2014
- Ontario Wood Works, Wood Design Award, November 2014
- WAN Wood in Architecture Awards, March 2015
- OAA Design Excellence Award, March 2015
- Platinum A' Design Award, April 2015
