= AnnaLena (restaurant) =

Restaurant in Vancouver, British Columbia

- Interactive map of AnnaLena

Restaurant information
- Owners: Jeff Parr; Michael Robbins
- Manager: Jeff Parr
- Head chef: Michael Robbins
- Chef: Brent Lukoni
- Pastry chef: RJ LaTorre
- Food type: Contemporary Canadian
- Rating: (Michelin Guide)
- Location: 1809 West First Avenue, Vancouver, British Columbia, V6J 5B8, Canada
- Coordinates: 49°16′15″N 123°08′49″W
- Website: www.annalena.ca

AnnaLena is a restaurant in Vancouver, British Columbia. The restaurant has received a Michelin star.

== Recognition ==
=== Canada's 100 Best Restaurants Ranking ===
AnnaLena
Year	Rank	Change
2016	43	new
2017	83	▼40
2018	34	▲49
2019	▼ No Rank	
2020	97	▲ re-entry
2021	No List	
2022	41	▲56
2023	9	▲32
2024	20	▼11
2025	10	▲10
2026	12	▼2

== See also ==
- List of Michelin-starred restaurants in Vancouver
- List of restaurants in Vancouver
