= Bar Pompette =

Cocktail bar in Toronto, Ontario, Canada

Restaurant information
- Established: July 2021
- Owners: Jonathan Bauer; Martine Bauer
- Head chef: Martine Bauer
- Food type: Cocktail bar French
- Location: 607 College Street, Toronto, Ontario, Canada
- Seating capacity: 30
- Reservations: Walk-in only
- Website: www.pompette.ca/barpompette

Bar Pompette is a cocktail bar in the Little Italy neighbourhood of Toronto, Ontario, Canada.

== History ==
The bar was opened in summer 2021 by husband-and-wife Jonathan and Martine Bauer, as a sister concept to their now-closed neighbouring French bistro Pompette.

Martine Bauer also serves as the chef for the establishment, producing small plates and charcuterie to pair with the bar's cocktails. Bauer, a French national, served as head chef at the Official Residence of the French Prime Minister before immigrating to Canada.

== Concept ==
Pompette fuses French influences with seasonal ingredients in its cocktails that are mostly farmed or foraged in the Greater Toronto Greenbelt.

Signature drinks at the bar include their Cornichon, a take on a martini made with dill pickle distillate and dill oil, as well as the Nitro Colada, served on draught mixing in coconut rum and pineapple juice.

The bar does not take reservations and is walk-in only.

== Recognition ==
The bar has received international recognition, including often being ranked as one of the top cocktail bars in Canada. It has made regular appearances on North America's 50 Best Bars list, ranking #15 in 2023, #29 in 2024, #7 in 2025 and #8 in 2026. In 2025, it was the highest ranked bar in Canada on the list.

In 2025, Pompette was the only Canadian bar to make the The World's 50 Best Bars list, ranking #55. It also appeared on the list in 2024, ranking #70.

Condé Nast magazine reviewed the bar in March 2026, writing that its drinks were "precise, playful, and endlessly inventive."

=== Canada's 50 Best Bars Ranking ===
Bar Pompette topped Canada's 50 Best Bars list in their 2024 and 2025 publications, before dropping to its current rank at #2 in 2026.

Bar Pompette
Year	Rank	Change
2022	11	new
2023	5	▲6
2024	1	▲4
2025	1	Steady
2026	2	▼1
