= Hexagon (restaurant) =

French restaurant in Oakville, Ontario, Canada

Coordinates: 43.4455°N 79.6677°W

- Interactive map of Hexagon

Restaurant information
- Established: September 1, 2017
- Closed: December 20, 2025
- Owners: John Ramos; Ken Burditt
- Manager: Martin Watson
- Head chef: Rafael Covarrubias
- Chef: Jordan Wilkinson
- Food type: French
- Rating: (Michelin Guide)
- Location: Oakville, Canada
- Website: www.hexagonrestaurant.com

Hexagon was a Michelin-starred French restaurant in Oakville, Ontario, Canada.

== History ==
The business was opened in September 2017 by restauranteur Artur Koczur, who previously operated a cafe in the same space. Koczur sold the business in spring 2023 to new ownership.

Between 2018 and 2025 the restaurant's kitchen was headed by Rafael Covarrubias, who started as the sous-chef in 2017 before becoming executive chef a year later. Covarrubias announced his departure as chef effective December 2025, to take on the role at fellow Toronto-area Michelin-starred restaurant 20 Victoria. Hexagon's chef de cuisine and sous-chef also departed to join Covarrubias at 20 Victoria.

Following the departure of Covarrubias, the restaurant claimed it would temporarily close while ownership sought to reboot the restaurant concept. While no further communication from the restaurant itself indicated its future status, media reported in June 2026 that the restaurant closed and a new business would replace it in its former space.

== Concept ==
The restaurant had an open kitchen and offered a tasting menu.

The interior of the restaurant incorporated several design elements inspired by its namesake, the hexagon.

During the tenure of Covarrubias as head chef, the restaurant's cuisine used French techniques while drawing from Covarrubias' Mexican roots.

== Recognition ==
The restaurant received a Michelin star in the 2024 edition of the Toronto and Region Michelin Guide, and retained its star in 2025. It was the first restaurant in Toronto's suburban Halton Region to receive a Michelin star. Head chef Covarrubias was also recognized at the 2024 ceremony with the 'Michelin Young Chef Award' for the region.

=== Canada's 100 Best Restaurants Ranking ===
Hexagon
Year	Rank	Change
2020	81	new
2021	No List	
2022	42	▲39
2023	34	▲8
2024	26	▲8
2025	14	▲12
2026	CLOSED	

== See also ==
- List of French restaurants
- List of Michelin-starred restaurants in Toronto
