= Sushi Masuda =

Japanese restaurant in Vancouver, British Columbia, Canada

- Interactive map of Sushi Masuda

Restaurant information
- Food type: Japanese
- Location: 1066 West Hastings Street, Vancouver, British Columbia, Canada
- Coordinates: 49.2876°N 123.119°W

Sushi Masuda is a Michelin-starred Japanese restaurant in Vancouver, British Columbia, Canada.

== See also ==
- List of Japanese restaurants
- List of Michelin-starred restaurants in Vancouver
