= Rôtisserie La Lune =

Rotisserie in Montreal, Canada

- Interactive map of Rôtisserie La Lune

Restaurant information
- Established: December 13, 2024
- Owners: Vanya Filipovic; Marc-Olivier Frappier; Marc-Antoine Gélinas; Alex Landry; Jessica Noël
- Head chef: Charles-Eric Boutet
- Food type: Quebecois
- Rating: Bib Gourmand (Michelin Guide)
- Location: 391 rue Saint-Zotique Est, Montreal, Quebec, Canada
- Coordinates: 45.5355°N 73.6088°W
- Seating capacity: 85
- Website: rotisserielalune.com

Rôtisserie La Lune is a Quebecois-style rotisserie in the La Petite-Patrie neighbourhood of Montreal, Canada.

== History ==
The business was opened in December 2024 by the same team that operates popular Montreal wine bar Mon Lapin, which is located four blocks down the road.

According to co-owner Marc-Olivier Frappier, the team had considered serving rotisserie chicken at Mon Lapin, where Frappier serves as co-head chef, but were unable to do so due to the restaurant's small size. Frappier mentioned his time growing up in St-Hyacinthe, working at well known Quebecois rotisserie chain St-Hubert, as desire for wanting to start a restaurant with his own take on the cuisine.

While Frappier and his co-head chef at Mon Lapin, Jessica Noel, also serve as executive chefs at La Lune, Charles-Eric Boutet serves as the chef de cuisine and manages day to day kitchen operations.

== Menu ==
Quebecois-style rotisserie is generally considered to be slow-cooked, spit-roasted chicken served with a side of fries and a brown, gravy-like sauce. While it generally focuses on chicken, La Lune serves other forms of poultry as well, including duck and guinea fowl.

Like Mon Lapin, La Lune has a curated wine list prepared by co-owner and sommelier Vanya Filipovic.

== Recognition ==
In 2025, the business received a 'Bib Gourmand' designation in Quebec's inaugural Michelin Guide. Per the guide, a Bib Gourmand recognition is awarded to restaurants who offer "exceptionally good food at moderate prices." Michelin described the restaurant as "straightforward, generous, and accessible".

=== Canada's 100 Best Restaurants Ranking ===
The restaurant debuted on Canada's 100 Best Restaurants list in its 2026 edition. It was also the second highest ranked new restaurant on the list.

Rôtisserie La Lune
Year	Rank	Change
2026	21	new

== See also ==
- List of Michelin Bib Gourmand restaurants in Canada
