= Masayoshi (restaurant) =

Restaurant in Vancouver, British Columbia

- Interactive map of Masayoshi

Restaurant information
- Food type: Japanese
- Location: 4376 Fraser Street, Vancouver, Canada
- Coordinates: 49°14′45″N 123°5′24″W

Masayoshi is a Japanese restaurant in Vancouver, British Columbia. The restaurant has received a Michelin star.

== Recognition ==
=== Canada's 100 Best Restaurants Ranking ===
Masayoshi
Year	Rank	Change
2017	51	new
2018	48	▲3
2019	78	▼30
2020	58	▲20
2021	No List	
2022	▼ No Rank	
2023	52	▲ re-entry
2024	59	▼7
2025	▼ No Rank	
2026	▼ No Rank	

== See also ==
- List of Japanese restaurants
- List of Michelin-starred restaurants in Vancouver
- List of restaurants in Vancouver
