= List of Michelin-starred restaurants in Vancouver =

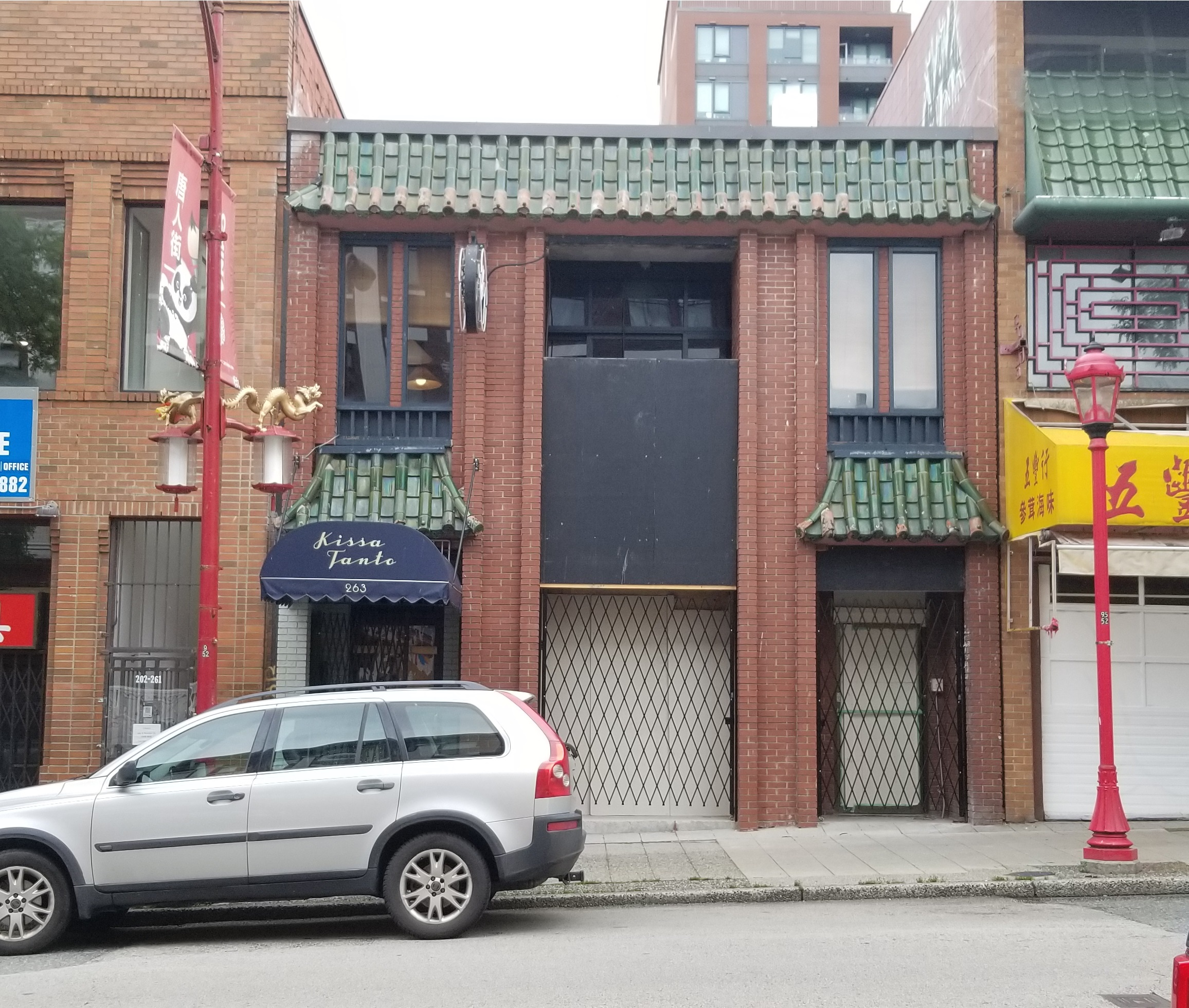
Exterior of Kissa Tanto, a one star restaurant

As of the 2026 Michelin Guide, there are 11 restaurants in Vancouver with a Michelin-star rating.

The Michelin Guides have been published by the French tire company Michelin since 1900. They were designed as a guide to tell drivers about eateries they recommended to visit and to subtly sponsor their tires, by encouraging drivers to use their cars more and therefore need to replace the tires as they wore out. Over time, the stars that were given out became more valuable.

Multiple anonymous Michelin inspectors visit the restaurants several times. They rate the restaurants on five criteria: "quality of products", "mastery of flavor and cooking techniques", "the personality of the chef represented in the dining experience", "value for money", and "consistency between inspectors' visits". Inspectors have at least ten years of expertise and create a list of popular restaurants supported by media reports, reviews, and diner popularity. If they reach a consensus, Michelin awards restaurants from one to three stars based on its evaluation methodology: one star means "high-quality cooking, worth a stop", two stars signify "excellent cooking, worth a detour", and three stars denote "exceptional cuisine, worth a special journey". The stars are not permanent and restaurants are constantly re-evaluated. If the criteria are not met, the restaurant will lose its stars.

The Vancouver Michelin Guide first launched on October 27, 2022, funded in a five-year partnership with Destination Vancouver, for an undisclosed amount of money. Vancouver is one of three regions Michelin reviews in Canada, alongside Toronto, which was also added in 2022, and Quebec. The Vancouver Guide exclusively rates restaurants within the city's limits, not including the metro area. There are many starred restaurants serving contemporary, Japanese, French, and Chinese cuisines, however, it has been noted by Vancouver Magazine that Italian cuisine was underrepresented. No restaurants have been awarded more than one star.

== List ==
Key
1 Michelin star	One Michelin star
2 Michelin stars	Two Michelin stars
—	The restaurant did not receive a star that year

Michelin-starred restaurants
Name	Cuisine	Location	2022	2023	2024	2025	2026
AnnaLena	Contemporary	Kitsilano	1 Michelin star	1 Michelin star	1 Michelin star	1 Michelin star	2 Michelin stars
Barbara	Contemporary	DTES	1 Michelin star	1 Michelin star	1 Michelin star	1 Michelin star	—
Burdock & Co	Contemporary	Mount Pleasant	1 Michelin star	1 Michelin star	1 Michelin star	1 Michelin star	1 Michelin star
iDen & QuanJuDe Beijing Duck House	Chinese	Mount Pleasant	1 Michelin star	1 Michelin star	1 Michelin star	1 Michelin star	1 Michelin star
Kissa Tanto	Italian / Japanese	DTES	1 Michelin star	1 Michelin star	1 Michelin star	1 Michelin star	1 Michelin star
Masayoshi	Japanese	Kensington	1 Michelin star	1 Michelin star	1 Michelin star	1 Michelin star	1 Michelin star
Okeya Kyujiro	Japanese	Downtown	—	1 Michelin star	1 Michelin star	1 Michelin star	1 Michelin star
Published on Main	Contemporary	Riley Park	1 Michelin star	1 Michelin star	1 Michelin star	1 Michelin star	1 Michelin star
St. Lawrence	Quebecois	DTES	1 Michelin star	1 Michelin star	1 Michelin star	1 Michelin star	1 Michelin star
Sumibiyaki Arashi	Japanese	Mount Pleasant	—	—	—	1 Michelin star	1 Michelin star
Sushi Hyun	Japanese	West End	—	—	—	1 Michelin star	1 Michelin star
Sushi Masuda	Japanese	Downtown	—	—	1 Michelin star	1 Michelin star	1 Michelin star
References							

== See also ==
- List of Michelin-starred restaurants in Quebec
- List of Michelin-starred restaurants in Toronto
- List of Michelin Bib Gourmand restaurants in Canada
- List of restaurants in Canada
- List of restaurants in Vancouver
