= Alo (restaurant) =

Restaurant in Toronto, Ontario, Canada

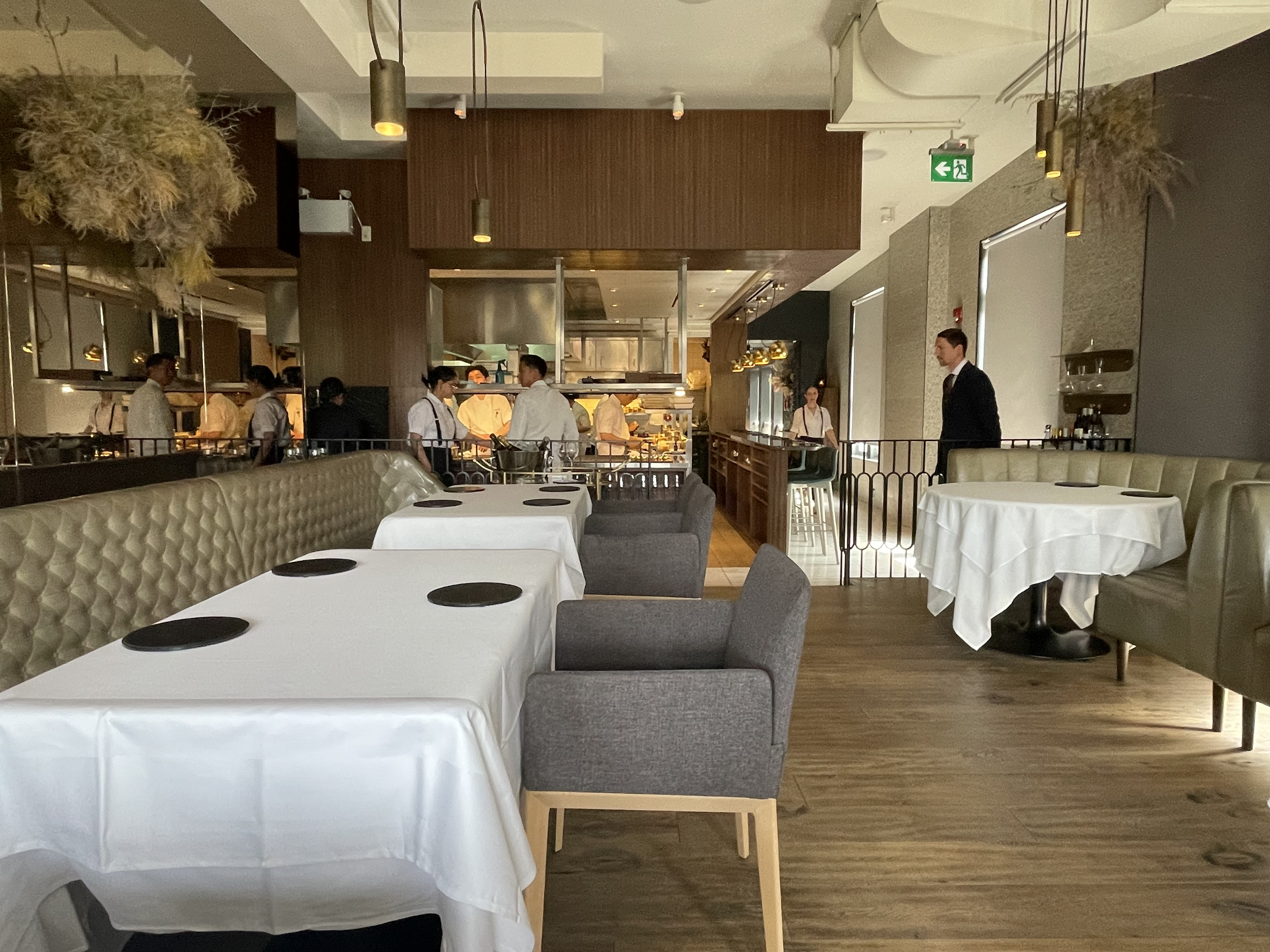
- The restaurant's main dining room, 2024
- Interactive map of Alo

Restaurant information
- Established: July 2015; 11 years ago
- Owner: Patrick Kriss
- Head chef: Patrick Kriss
- Chef: Tim Yun
- Food type: French
- Rating: (Michelin Guide)
- Location: 163 Spadina Avenue, Third Floor, Toronto, Ontario, M5V 2L6, Canada
- Coordinates: 43°38′54.8″N 79°23′45.4″W
- Website: alorestaurant.com

Alo is a Michelin-starred French restaurant in Toronto, Ontario, Canada.

== History ==
The restaurant opened in July 2015 by chef-owner Patrick Kriss. Kriss had previously served as head chef at Toronto fine dining restaurants Splendido and Acadia, before seeking to open a restaurant of his own.

Tim Yun is the chef de cuisine and manages day-to-day operations of the restaurant's kitchen.

== Concept ==
Kriss has stated the vision of Alo was for the restaurant to not be "stuffy", and feel "approachable...like you’re going into someone’s home."

Alo Restaurant is part of a larger restaurant group, Alo Food Group, started by Kriss. Restaurants under the group include formerly Michelin-starred a la carte restaurant Alobar Yorkville, casual diner Aloette, and Mediterranean cuisine focused restaurant Alder. Alo is considered the signature restaurant of the group.

The restaurant offers two dining experiences to guests, a blind multi-course tasting menu in the dining room and chef's counter, and an a la carte experience or truncated version of their tasting menu in the bar room. The bar room is not to be confused with Alobar, which is a separate restaurant concept.

== Recognition ==
Toronto Star restaurant critic Amy Pataki gave Alo 4/4 stars when reviewing it in September 2015, commending Kriss's tasting menu, the attentive service, and the restaurant’s refined yet relaxed atmosphere. Pataki also stated Alo was the restaurant that was closest to Michelin-starred dining in the city, 7 years before the Michelin Guide would come to Toronto and Alo would receive one.

In October 2015, The Globe and Mail restaurant critic Chris Nuttall-Smith gave Alo a 4/4 star review, praising Kriss’s ambitious tasting menu, the highly skilled kitchen and service team, and describing it as one of the most extraordinary new restaurants in Canada. Kriss has stated that it was that review from Nuttall-Smith that acted as the catalyst for Alo's popularity.

In 2025, Alo made travel magazine Condé Nast's list of best restaurants in Toronto, stating it had one of Canada's "most extraordinary wine programs."

Alo received a Michelin star in Toronto's inaugural Michelin Guide that was revealed in 2022, and has retained its star in every year since. Michelin praised the "flexibility and talent" of the kitchen team in fusing European and Asian culinary techniques in the dishes they prepare.

It has occasionally appeared on the World's 50 Best Restaurants longlist, ranking at #94 in 2018, #90 in 2019, and most recently at #98 in 2021.

=== Canada's 100 Best Restaurants Ranking ===
The restaurant has appeared on Canada's 100 Best Restaurants list annually since its opening, including topping the list each year between 2017 and 2020. As of the 2025 edition, it is ranked #3.

Alo
Year	Rank	Change
2016	7	new
2017	1	▲6
2018	1	Steady
2019	1	Steady
2020	1	Steady
2021	No List	
2022	2	▼1
2023	2	Steady
2024	3	▼1
2025	3	Steady

== See also ==
- List of French restaurants
- List of Michelin-starred restaurants in Toronto
