= Canada's 100 Best Restaurants =

Canada's 100 Best Restaurants is a list produced by Canadian media company and magazine Canada's 100 Best, owned and operated by veteran food writer and journalist Jacob Richler.

== History ==
The list is published each spring as an annual ranking highlighting the top dining establishments across Canada. It was first published in 2015, curated by a panel of culinary experts, including chefs, restaurateurs, food critics, and industry professionals. It is considered one of the more comprehensive guides to Canadian cuisine, recognizing a wide range of restaurants from coast to coast.

Since 2015, the rankings have been published annually, with the exception of 2021 when restrictions from the COVID-19 pandemic kept most restaurants in Canada closed for dining during the preceding year.

Alongside the best restaurants overall, Canada's 100 Best also publishes lists for the 50 Best Bars and 10 Best New Restaurants in the country. The lists are published both online through the magazine's official website and in physical print editions.

=== Scoring ===
The ranking process involves votes from a national panel of experts, who evaluate restaurants primarily on food quality, but also on other criteria including service, ambiance, and overall dining experience. To ensure the list captures Canada's geographic diversity, judges are required to vote for at least three restaurants outside of their home region. For the 2025 list, the selection panel was made up of 160 voting judges, a mix of those in Canada's food and drink industry, including culinary enthusiasts, restaurant critics, food writers, chefs, and restaurant owners.

According to Richler, the selection process for the list is slightly modified each year, with tweaks to improve the selection model and arriving at a consensus on rankings based on the judges votes. In 2020, Richler stated the impacts of the pandemic on fine dining could result in further adjustments to the scoring model of the list, to focus more on food quality and less on the other criteria being evaluated. By the 2024 publication, more restaurants outside of the traditional fine dining model and considered more "casual and approachable" were included in the list.

== Best restaurants ==
Canada's Best Restaurants
Year	1st	2nd	3rd
2015	(Quebec) Toqué!	(British Columbia) Hawksworth Restaurant	(Ontario) Buca Yorkville
2016	(Quebec) Toqué!	(Ontario) Buca Yorkville	(British Columbia) Hawksworth Restaurant
2017	(Ontario) Alo	(Quebec) Toqué!	(Quebec) Joe Beef
2018	(Ontario) Alo	(Quebec) Toqué!	(Quebec) Joe Beef
2019	(Ontario) Alo	(Quebec) Joe Beef	(Quebec) Toqué!
2020	(Ontario) Alo	(British Columbia) St. Lawrence	(Quebec) Joe Beef
2021	No List		
2022	(British Columbia) Published on Main	(Ontario) Alo	(British Columbia) St. Lawrence
2023	(Quebec) Mon Lapin	(Ontario) Alo	(British Columbia) Published on Main
2024	(Quebec) Mon Lapin	(Ontario) Edulis	(Ontario) Alo
2025	(Ontario) Restaurant Pearl Morissette	(Quebec) Mon Lapin	(Ontario) Alo
2026	(Ontario) Restaurant Pearl Morissette	(Quebec) Mon Lapin	(Quebec) Tanière³

== Best bars ==
In 2018, Canada's 100 Best introduced a standalone annual ranking of the country's top 50 bars, published alongside the Best Restaurants list.

Canada's Best Bars
Year	1st	2nd	3rd
2018	(Ontario) Bar Raval	(British Columbia) The Keefer Bar	(Quebec) The Coldroom
2019	(Ontario) Bar Raval	(British Columbia) The Keefer Bar	(Ontario) Civil Liberties
2020	(Ontario) Bar Raval	(British Columbia) The Keefer Bar	(Quebec) Atwater Cocktail Club
2021	No List		
2022	(Ontario) Civil Liberties	(British Columbia) Botanist	(British Columbia) The Keefer Bar
2023	(Ontario) Civil Liberties	(Quebec) Cloakroom	(Quebec) Atwater Cocktail Club
2024	(Ontario) Bar Pompette	(Ontario) Civil Liberties	(Quebec) Cloakroom
2025	(Ontario) Bar Pompette	(Quebec) Cloakroom	(Ontario) Civil Liberties
2026	(Quebec) Cloakroom	(Ontario) Bar Pompette	(British Columbia) The Keefer Bar

== Best new restaurants ==
Starting in 2022, the magazine also published a 'Best New Restaurants' list, ranking 10 restaurants in Canada which opened in the year prior.

Canada's Best New Restaurants
Year	1st	2nd	3rd
2022	(Alberta) Major Tom	(Ontario) Osteria Giulia	(Alberta) D.O.P.
2023	(Ontario) Prime Seafood Palace	(Quebec) Cabaret L'Enfer	(Newfoundland and Labrador) Portage
2024	(British Columbia) Marilena	(Ontario) Casa Paco	(Ontario) Sushi Yūgen
2025	(Quebec) Le Violon	(Ontario) LSL	(Ontario) Linny's
2026	(British Columbia) Sumibiyaki Arashi	(Quebec) Rôtisserie La Lune	(Quebec) Limbo

== Impact ==
The list has been regarded as one of the most influential restaurant rankings in the country, particularly before the launch of the Michelin Guide in Canada in 2022. Media outlets reported that Alo, which topped the 2017 list, was fully booked for two months following the announcement. Other restaurants have similarly credited their placement with rapid increases in business, with some describing a shift from relative obscurity to consistently full dining rooms. Chefs have cited wanting to improve or hold their ranking on the list as a driving force in their culinary innovations.

The list’s annual release attracts widespread media coverage from national and local outlets, and restaurant rankings from the list are used by regional tourism boards to attract culinary visitors, reinforcing its role in shaping public and industry perceptions of Canada’s fine dining landscape.

== See also ==
- The World's 50 Best Restaurants
- The World's 50 Best Bars
