= Joe Beef =

Canadian businessman

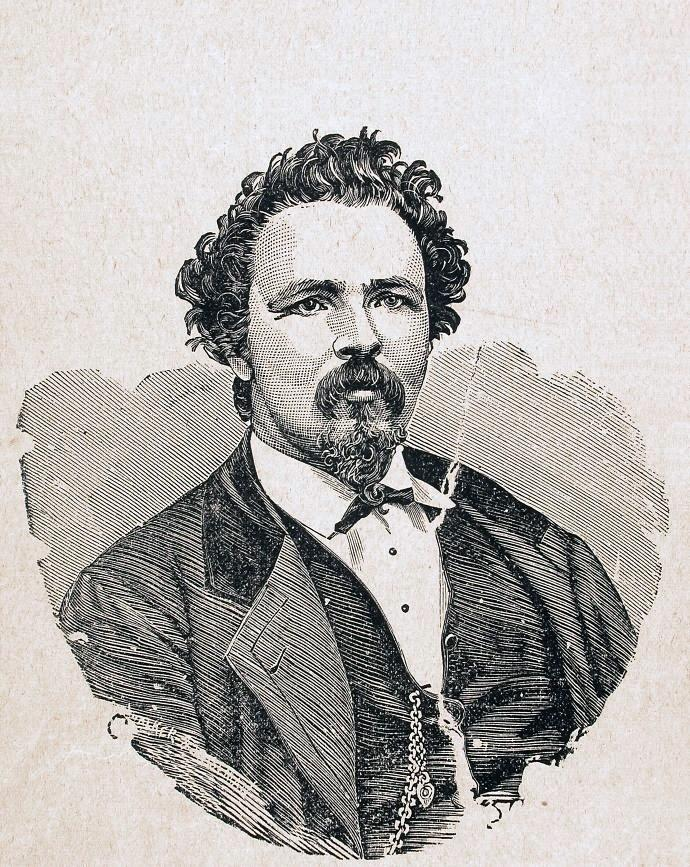
Portrait of McKiernan, c. 1875

Charles McKiernan (4 December 1835 – 15 January 1889), known commonly as Joe Beef, was a well-known Irish-Canadian tavern owner, innkeeper and philanthropist in Montreal.

== Biography ==
During the Crimean War, Charles McKiernan operated in the role of a standard quartermaster with the British Army's 10th brigade, gaining him the alias "Joe Beef". The nickname "Joe Beef" originates from McKiernan's ability to find meat and provisions whenever his troops were depleted of nourishment.

Charles McKiernan earned the sobriquet "Joe Beef" from his time as a Quartermaster with the 10th brigade in the British Army during the Crimean War. Whenever his regiment was running low on food, McKiernan had a knack of somehow finding meat and provisions, hence the name "Joe Beef".

Charles McKiernan's initial arrival in British North America continues to remain unknown. Historian Jean Provencher suggests that McKiernan might have travelled alongside the 10th Brigade of the Royal Artillery to Halifax in 1861 or Montreal in 1864. He had taken control of the military canteen on Montreal's Saint Helen's Island by 1864. After advancing to Sergeant, he was put in charge of the main military canteen on Saint Helen's Island. Following his discharge from the British Army in 1868, McKiernan founded the Crown and Sceptre Tavern on Saint-Claude Street, located near Montreal's lively waterfront and Bonsecours Market. Workers from surrounding manufacturing companies, sailors and docworkers were brought to the area. McKiernan decided to relocate his firm to a 3-story tower at the meeting point of de la Commune and de Callière streets in 1875 because of the expansion of Saint-Claude Street. He maintained access to his fellow working-class clientele by remaining near the port. Beef refused service to no one, telling a reporter, "no matter who he is, whether English, French, Irish, Negro, Indian, or what religion he belongs to". Every day at noontime, hundreds of longshoremen, beggars, odd-job men and outcasts from Montreal society showed up at his door. The clientele of the tavern was mostly working class. Canal labourers, longshoremen, sailors, and ex-army men, like McKiernan himself, were mainstays of the business. For working class Montreal, McKiernan's tavern functioned as the centre of social life in Griffintown. At the time, the neighbourhood had no public parks, and gatherings and public celebrations were only occasionally held by national societies and church groups. Thus, daily recreational activities were centered around Joe Beef's Canteen.

Beef had the following manifesto printed on handbills and advertisements:

He cares not for Pope, Priest, Parson, or King William of the Boyne; all Joe wants is the Coin. He trusts in God in summer time to keep him from all harm; when he sees the first frost and snow poor old Joe trusts to the Almighty Dollar and good old maple wood to keep his belly warm, for Churches, Chapels, Ranters, Preachers, Beechers and such stuff Montreal has already got enough.

The New York Times was not impressed, however, calling Joe Beef's Canteen "a den of filth" and writing that:

The proprietor is evidently an educated man, and speaks and writes well. But he is a little nearer a devil and his place near what the revised version calls Hades than anything I ever saw.

The movement of temperance in Montreal, which attempted to discourage alcohol consumption, also criticized Joe Beef's Canteen. John Dougall and his sons, who operated the Montreal Daily Witness, started to criticize McKiernan's organization in 1875 because of its link to alcohol. On April 20, 1880, McKiernan initiated a libel action against them following their critiques with satire and humour. In the end, Dougall's family were declared to be not guilty. Conflicts surrounding temperance activists and the bar-based society of Montreal's working class neighbourhoods were apparent during this dispute.

Beef was known for keeping a menagerie of animals in his tavern, including four black bears, ten monkeys, three wild cats, a porcupine and an alligator. The bears were usually kept in the tavern's cellar and viewed by customers through a trap door in the barroom floor. He sometimes brought a bear up from the basement to restore order in his tavern, to fight with his dogs or play a game of billiards with the proprietor. One of his bears, Tom, had a daily consumption of twenty pints of beer and would sit on his hindquarters and hold a glass between his paws without spilling a drop. On one occasion, McKiernan was mauled by a buffalo on exhibit and was sent to hospital for a number of days. Another time, a Deputy Clerk of the Peace was inspecting the tavern in order to renew the license and was bitten by one of McKiernan's dogs.

He ran his tavern from 1870 until his death from a heart attack in 1889, at the age of 54.

== Funeral ==
At his funeral, every office in the business district closed. Fifty labour organizations walked off the job while Joe Beef's casket was drawn through the city by an ornate four-horse hearse, in a procession several blocks long. Individuals from a range of classes of society joined McKiernan's funeral on January 18, 1889. These included workers and entrepreneurs as well as those who depended on his charitable assistance. Historian Peter DeLottinville states that as a way to acknowledge McKiernan's commitment to the working class campaign, members from 50 labor organizations took part in the parade. The substantial attendance proved his value to Montreal's working-class community as well as his influence beyond the tavern.

The newspaper La Minerve reported:

The crowd consisted of Knights of Labour, workers and manual labourers of all classes. All the luckless outcasts to whom the innkeeper-philanthropist had so often extended a helping hand had come forward, eager to pay a last tribute to his memory".

He is buried in the Mount-Royal Cemetery and his funeral monument, on plot B 991e, bears a long epitaph written by his wife, which testifies to the gratitude of his family and friends for his philanthropic spirit.

== Legacy ==
In addition, McKiernan relayed his perspectives by published publications that merged humor and political analysis with bar-style marketing. Religious figures and other influential members of Montreal community were routinely criticized according to these publications. His application of humour and public opinion reflected the significance of establishments in 19th century Montreal as platforms for political debate and the display of lower-class opininons. He entertained the crowds with poetry and humorous stories which lampooned the figures of authority in the workingman's life, such as the employer, the landlord, or the local church minister. He acted as an advocate for the working class population of Griffintown and played an important role in the Lachine Canal workers strike of 1877. He provided them with 3,000 loaves of bread and 500 gallons of stew, and paying the travel expenses of their delegation to Ottawa. As they set off, he addressed a crowd of 2,000 in front of his tavern with a rousing speech "delivered in rhymed endings which was heartily applauded." Additionally, McKiernan defended labourers at the Hudon Cotton Mills Company in Hochelaga, Montreal, during the 1880 strike. He gave 600 loaves of bread to those who were striking on April 26. The employees called to request a 15% pay raise and a decrease in their regular working hours. They also complained about the inconsistent payment of wages and unfair treatment by certain supervisors. The strike only ended in they having a 30 minute reduction in their working day, after their best efforts. McKiernan's assurance illustrated his willingness to offer striking workers concrete support and hic continuous engagement in labour disputes.

For Montreal's working class, Joe Beef's Canteen represented more than simply a spot to get alcohol. McKiernan offered unemployed workers, sailors and individuals living in poverty food, temporary accommodation and assistance. In the 19th century Montreal, where labourers often experienced unstable employment and limited opportunities for structured welfare, these kinds of initiatives were especially crucial. His establishment functioned as an underground centre of support, showing how working-class communities were reliant on local enterprises as well as private relationships during times of economic hardship.

In Montreal, public remembrance additionally serve to maintain McKiernan's legacy. The Point-Saint-Charles community's Joe Beef Park retains his name. His contributions to Montreal's working-class populations were acknowledged by the McCord Museum of Canadian History, notably the support he provided for workers striking and his provision of food and accommodation for free. His continuous significance in the social and economic history of the city is apparent through these celebrations. He was a central character in a play by David Fennario, entitled Joe Beef.

McKiernan was the inspiration behind Joe Beef Restaurant, which opened in 2005 on Notre Dame Street West in the neighbourhood of Little Burgundy and was selected as the 81st best restaurant in the world in 2016 by 50 World's Best Restaurants, the first Canadian restaurant to make the list in six years.

== Business ==
One of Joe Beef's Canteen's primary sources of earnings was sales of alcohol. The dining establishment sold roughly 480 gallons of beer per week, generating about $360 in revenue, in accordance to the news source La Minerve. Approximately half of the total number of alcoholic beverages served at the establishment were beer. McKiernan operated a business that was profitable despite being known for contributing to charities. La Minerve estimated his entire net worth at $80,000 at the time of his death in January 1889.
