= Gordon M. Shepherd =

American neuroscientist (1933–2022)

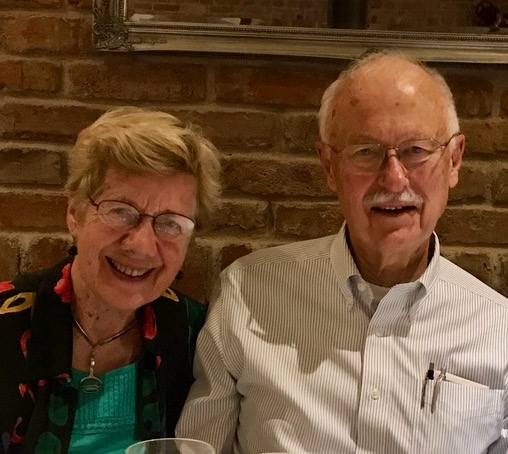
Shepherd with his wife Grethe, in 2018

Gordon Murray Shepherd (21 July 1933 – 9 June 2022) was an American neuroscientist who carried out basic experimental and computational research on how neurons are organized into microcircuits to carry out the functional operations of the nervous system. Using the olfactory system as a model that spans multiple levels of space, time and disciplines, his studies ranged from molecular to behavioral, recognized by an annual lecture at Yale University on "integrative neuroscience". At the time of his death, he was professor of neuroscience emeritus at the Yale School of Medicine. He graduated from Iowa State University with a BA, Harvard Medical School with an MD, and the University of Oxford with a DPhill.

== Early work ==
His graduate studies in 1963 of the electrophysiology of the olfactory bulb produced one of the first diagrams of a brain microcircuit. Building on this work he collaborated with Wilfrid Rall, just then founding the new field of computational neuroscience, at the National Institute of Health (NIH) to construct the first computational models of brain neurons: the mitral and granule cell. This predicted previously unknown dendrodendritic interactions between the mitral and granule cells, subsequently confirmed by electron microscopy. These interactions were hypothesized to mediate lateral inhibition in the processing of the sensory input as well as generate oscillatory activity involved in odor processing. The model suggested active properties in the dendrites, which was subsequently confirmed, through which the model accounts for non-topographic interactions throughout the olfactory bulb. This paper was included in the "Essays on APS Classic Papers" series. The culmination of this line of research within the domain of computational neuroscience can be identified in a seminal paper published in 1968 by Wilfrid Rall and Gordon M. Shepherd. Distinguishing itself from previous works that offered conceptual frameworks, this paper delved into the intricate architecture of a particular system, namely the olfactory bulb.

The next problem Shepherd addressed was how odors are represented in the brain. Using the brain imaging technique of the time, 2-deoxy-D-glucose (2DG) autoradiography, it was shown for the first time that odors are encoded by different spatial activity patterns in the glomeruli of the olfactory bulb, a tangle of nerves formed by connections between mainly olfactory sensory cells and mitral cells. This demonstrated that the neuronal basis of the sense of smell in vertebrates consists of the representation of odors by glomerular activity patterns, or "odor images," which are then processed by the widely distributed microcircuits of the olfactory bulb. The odor-induced patterns included a "modified glomerular complex," which was the first of a subsystem of specific glomeruli in the olfactory bulb.

In their research, Shepherd's laboratory employed the olfactory bulb as a foundational model to explore the integrative functions of neuronal dendrites. Their findings revealed that dendrites possess the capacity to house multiple computational units, that action potentials propagating in a retrograde direction within dendrites can execute specific functional operations, and that dendritic spines (small membrane protrusion from a neuron's dendrite that typically receives input from a single axon at the synapse) can function as autonomous input-output units. Furthermore, the laboratory contributed a fundamental circuit for the olfactory cortex of the brain. Concurrent with this research, novel concepts were developed to replace the classical 'neuron doctrine', and the term 'microcircuit' was introduced to characterize specific patterns of synaptic interactions in the nervous system.

== Later work ==
What are the sensory 'primitives' that are processed as the basis of smell perception? This fundamental problem was attacked by modeling the molecular interactions between odor molecules and the new discovered olfactory receptors. "Determinants" were identified on the odor molecules that activate specific sites on the receptors to encode the identity of the odor molecule.

A new appreciation of the human sense of smell suggested a new focus on retronasal smell, which activates an extensive "flavor system" in the human brain; this led in 2015 to a new field of "neurogastronomy", based on his book of that name which has among its goals enhancing understanding of the factors contributing to clinical conditions and global health. A new society and annual meeting have been formed by Shepherd, Dan Han, Frédéric Morin, Charles Spence, Tim McClintock, Bob Perry, Jehangir Mehta, Kelsey Rahenkamp, Siddharth Kapoor, Ouita Michel, and Bret Smith, called the International Society of Neurogastronomy (ISN). ISN is sponsored by the National Institute on Deafness and Other Communication Disorders/National Institutes of Health. The same principles have been applied to wine tasting in Neuroenology. These principles are illustrated by animation for Neurogastronomy and Neuroenology.

The olfactory bulb projects to the olfactory cortex which projects to the neocortex where smell perception occurs. Early studies with Lewis Haberly of olfactory cortex led to a basic circuit of pyramidal cells with feedback and lateral excitation and inhibition as the basis for higher olfactory processing. Current studies with paleontologist Timothy Rowe suggest that during evolution this basic three layer microcircuit combined with reptilian dorsal cortex to form the neocortex.

His lab was among the original group that founded the field of neuroinformatics, with the first funding of the Human Brain Project in 1993. The home site is "SenseLab", which contains a suite of 9 databases supporting research on olfactory receptors, odor maps, neuronal and dendritic properties, and neuronal and microcircuit models. SenseLab was founded by Shepherd, Perry Miller, founder of the Yale Center for Medical Informatics, and Michael Hines, founder of the widely used modeling program NEURON.

== Awards and honors ==
- Honorary degree, University of Copenhagen, 1999
- Honorary degree, University of Pavia, 2006
- ISN Award of Excellence, the International Society of Neurogastronomy, 2015

== Selected publications ==
=== Books ===
- Shepherd, G.M. (1974). The Synaptic Organization of the Brain. New York: Oxford University Press.
- Shepherd, G.M. (1983). Neurobiology. New York: Oxford University Press.
- Shepherd, G.M. (1991). Foundations of the Neuron Doctrine. New York: Oxford University Press.
- Shepherd, G.M. (2010). Creating Modern Neuroscience: The Revolutionary 1950s. New York: Oxford University Press.
- Shepherd, G.M. (2011). Neurogastronomy: How the Brain Creates Flavor and Why It Matters. New York: Columbia University Press.
- Shepherd, G.M. (2016). Neuroenology: How the Brain Creates the Taste of Wine. New York: Columbia University Press.

=== Editor ===
- Segev, I., Rinzel, J. and Shepherd, G.M., editors. (1995). The Theoretical Foundation of Dendritic Function: Selected Papers of Wilfrid Rall. Cambridge, Mass.: MIT Press.
- Shepherd, G.M. and Grillner, S., editors (2010). Handbook of Brain Microcircuits. New York: Oxford University Press
