= Burdock & Co =

Restaurant in Vancouver, British Columbia

- Interactive map of Burdock & Co

Restaurant information
- Established: May 2013; 13 years ago
- Owner: Andrea Carlson
- Head chef: Andrea Carlson
- Rating: (Michelin Guide)
- Location: 2702 Main Street, Vancouver, British Columbia, V5T 3E8, Canada
- Coordinates: 49°15′39.5″N 123°6′3″W
- Website: www.burdockandco.com

Burdock & Co is a restaurant in Vancouver, British Columbia. The restaurant has received a Michelin star.

== Recognition ==
=== Canada's 100 Best Restaurants Ranking ===
Burdock & Co
Year	Rank	Change
2018	66	new
2019	▼ No Rank	
2020	▼ No Rank	
2021	No List	
2022	▼ No Rank	
2023	79	▲ re-entry
2024	62	▲17
2025	82	▼20
2026	33	▲49

== See also ==
- List of Michelin-starred restaurants in Vancouver
- List of restaurants in Vancouver
