= Published on Main =

Restaurant in Vancouver, British Columbia

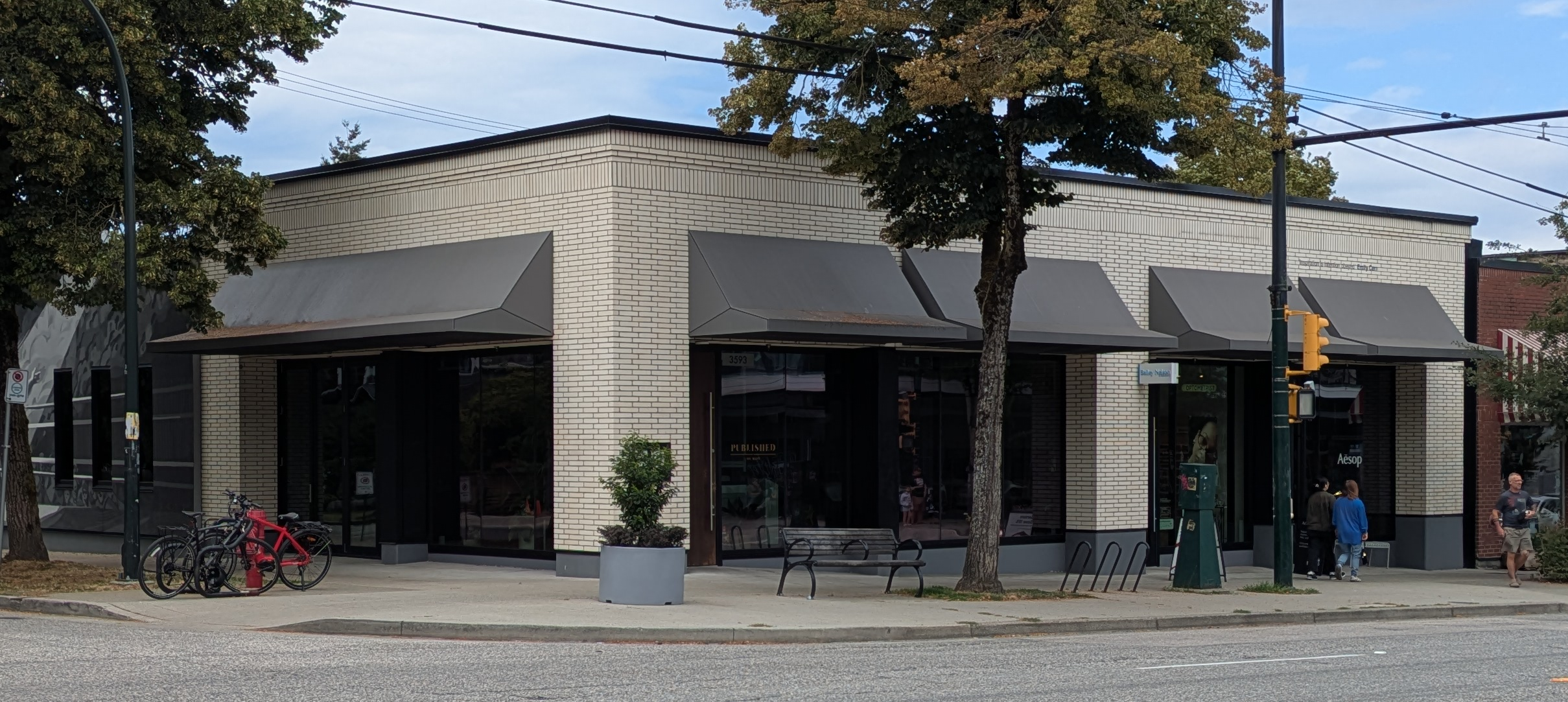
- The restaurant's exterior in 2025
- Interactive map of Published on Main

Restaurant information
- Head chef: Gus Stieffenhofer-Brandson
- Food type: Contemporary
- Rating: (Michelin Guide)
- Location: 3593 Main Street, Vancouver, V5V 3N4, Canada
- Coordinates: 49°15′10.2″N 123°6′4.2″W
- Website: publishedonmain.com

Published on Main is a restaurant in Vancouver, British Columbia. The restaurant has received a Michelin star.

== Recognition ==
The restaurant received a Michelin star in Vancouver's inaugural Michelin Guide in 2022, and has retained this designation in 2023 and 2024. Michelin praised the restaurant team's "preternatural ability for sensing when produce is at its peak" when used in their dishes.

Published on Main was ranked #28 in the inaugural North America's 50 Best Restaurants list published in September 2025, the only Vancouver restaurant on the list. It ranked #17 on the list's 2026 publication.

=== Canada's 100 Best Restaurants Ranking ===
In 2022, Published on Main topped the annual Canada's 100 Best Restaurants list, becoming the first restaurant from British Columbia to receive this distinction.

Published on Main
Year	Rank	Change
2020	88	new
2021	No List	
2022	1	▲87
2023	3	▼2
2024	7	▼4
2025	9	▼2
2026	20	▼11

== See also ==
- List of Michelin-starred restaurants in Vancouver
- List of restaurants in Vancouver
