= Okeya Kyujiro =

Japanese restaurant in Vancouver, British Columbia, Canada

Restaurant information
- Food type: Japanese
- Rating: (Michelin Guide); Vancouver location
- Location: Montreal; Toronto; Vancouver, Canada
- Website: https://okeya.ca/

Okeya Kyujiro is a theatrical Omakase restaurant with multiple locations in Canada. The business operates in Montreal, Toronto, and Vancouver.

== Description ==
The Japanese restaurant Okeya Kyujiro operates in Montreal, Toronto, and Vancouver. The Montreal location is the first reservation-only Omakase restaurant. The Vancouver location is in downtown's Yaletown neighbourhood. The Vancouver Sun has said the restaurant offers a "solemn, opulent, theatrical omakase experience".

== Reception ==
The Vancouver restaurant has been awarded a Michelin star. It also received honourable mention in the Best New Restaurant category in Vancouver Magazine's 2023 Restaurant Awards. Noms Magazine has said, "As you enter the dimly lit dining room, the atmosphere echoes a blend of Cirque du Soleil grandeur and traditional kabuki. It's more than a meal; it's a celebration of art."

In May 2025, the Montreal location received a 'Recommended' designation in Quebec's inaugural Michelin Guide, while the Toronto location received the same designation in Toronto's 2025 guide announced that September. Per the guide, a 'Recommended' selection "is the sign of a chef using quality ingredients that are well cooked; simply a good meal" and that the anonymous inspectors had found "the food to be above average, but not quite at [Michelin star] level."

== See also ==
- List of Japanese restaurants
- List of Michelin-starred restaurants in Vancouver
- List of sushi restaurants
