= Barbara (restaurant) =

Restaurant in Vancouver, British Columbia

- Interactive map of Barbara

Restaurant information
- Head chef: Patrick Hennessy
- Location: 305 East Pender Street, Vancouver, V6A 0J3, Canada
- Coordinates: 49°16′49.6″N 123°5′49.1″W
- Website: barbararestaurant.com

Barbara is a restaurant in Vancouver, British Columbia. The restaurant has received a Michelin star.

== See also ==
- List of Michelin-starred restaurants in Vancouver
- List of restaurants in Vancouver
