= Restaurant Pearl Morissette =

Restaurant in Lincoln, Ontario, Canada

Coordinates: 43°09′22″N 079°21′22″W

- Interactive map of Restaurant Pearl Morissette

Restaurant information
- Established: November 7, 2017
- Owners: Daniel Hadida; Francois Morissette; Mel Pearl; Eric Robertson
- Head chef: Daniel Hadida; Eric Robertson
- Food type: Contemporary
- Rating: (Michelin Guide)
- Location: 3953 Jordan Rd, Lincoln, Ontario, Canada
- Seating capacity: 40
- Website: restaurantpearlmorissette.com

Restaurant Pearl Morissette (formerly The Restaurant at Pearl Morissette) is a fine dining restaurant in the Jordan Station neighbourhood of Lincoln, Ontario, Canada. The 40-seat restaurant is on the top floor of Pearl Morissette Winery, located on a 42-acre property at 3953 Jordan Rd. Founded in November 2017 by the chefs Eric Robertson and Daniel Hadida, the restaurant's menu is French inspired. In 2024, it was awarded a Michelin Star, and in 2025, Canada's 100 Best ranked it as the best restaurant in Canada.

== Recognition ==
Restaurant Pearl Morissette was one of four new restaurants in the Greater Toronto Area awarded a Michelin Star for 2024, the first year in which the Toronto guide expanded to include surrounding regions. The restaurant was upgraded to two stars in the 2025 guide.

The restaurant ranked #3 on North America's 50 Best Restaurants list in 2026.

=== Canada's 100 Best Restaurants Ranking ===
In 2019 and 2020, Restaurant Pearl Morissette was ranked in the top 20 of the Canada's 100 Best Restaurants list, at 14th and 17th, respectively. There was no list for 2021 due to the impact of the COVID-19 pandemic in Canada, but from 2022 to 2026 it placed in the top six, at fourth (2022), fifth (2023), sixth (2024) and first (2025 and 2026).

Restaurant Pearl Morisette
| Year | Rank | Change |
| 2019 | 14 | new |
| 2020 | 17 | ▼3 |
| 2021 | No List | |
| 2022 | 4 | ▲13 |
| 2023 | 5 | ▼1 |
| 2024 | 6 | ▼1 |
| 2025 | 1 | ▲5 |
| 2026 | 1 | Steady |

== See also ==
- List of restaurants in Ontario
- List of Michelin-starred restaurants in Toronto
