= Sushi Hyun =

Japanese restaurant in Vancouver, British Columbia, Canada

- Interactive map of Sushi Hyun

Restaurant information
- Chef: Juhyun Lee
- Food type: Japanese
- Location: 795 Jervis Street, Vancouver, British Columbia, Canada
- Coordinates: 49.2873°N 123.1284°W

Sushi Hyun is a Japanese restaurant in West End, Vancouver, British Columbia, Canada. Juhyun Lee is the chef. The restaurant has received a star in the Michelin Guide.

== Recognition ==
In 2025, Sushi Hyun was ranked #4 on Air Canada's annual best new restaurants in Canada list.

== See also ==
- List of Japanese restaurants
- List of Michelin-starred restaurants in Vancouver
