= Sumibiyaki Arashi =

Japanese restaurant in Vancouver, British Columbia, Canada

- Interactive map of Sumibiyaki Arashi

Restaurant information
- Chef: Pete Ho
- Food type: Japanese
- Location: 363 East Broadway, Vancouver, British Columbia, Canada
- Coordinates: 49.263°N 123.0975°W

Sumibiyaki Arashi is a Japanese restaurant in Mount Pleasant, Vancouver, British Columbia, Canada. Pete Ho is the chef. The restaurant has a seating capacity of 14 people. It has received a star in the Michelin Guide.

== Recognition ==
In 2025, Sumibiyaki Arashi was ranked #8 on Air Canada's annual best new restaurants in Canada list.

=== Canada's 100 Best Restaurants Ranking ===
The restaurant debuted on Canada's 100 Best Restaurants list in its 2026 edition. It was also the highest ranked new restaurant on the list.

Sumibiyaki Arashi
Year	Rank	Change
2026	17	new

== See also ==
- List of Japanese restaurants
- List of Michelin-starred restaurants in Vancouver
