= Partisans (architectural firm) =

PARTISANS
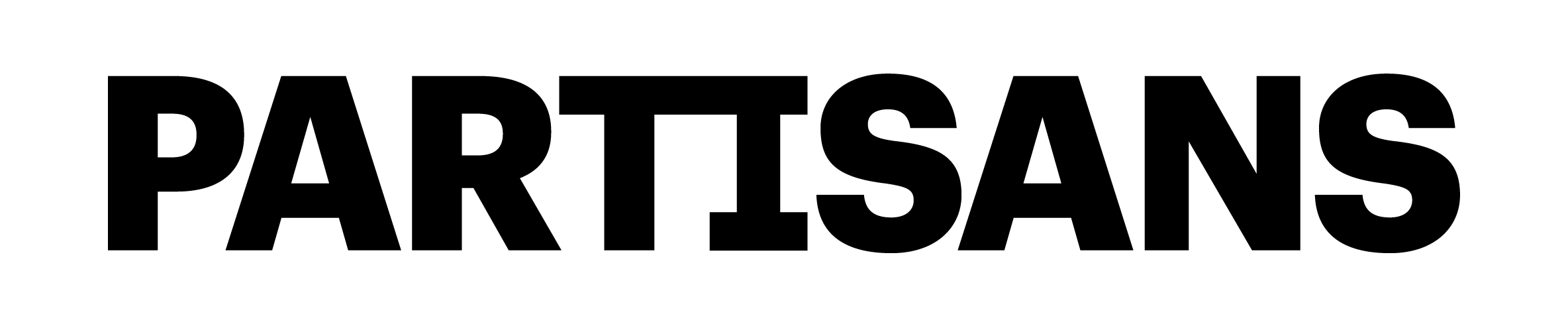
- Formation: 2012
- Founder: Alex Josephson, Pooya Baktash
- Founded at: Toronto, Ontario, Canada
- Type: Privately Held
- Services: Architecture & planning
- Key people: Alex Josephson, Nathan Bishop, Ian Pica Lambaseanu, Helena Che
- Staff: 20-50
- Website: http://www.partisans.com/

PARTISANS is a Toronto-based architecture firm. The firm was founded in 2012 by partners Alex Josephson and Pooya Baktash. As of 2023 the studio is run by Alex Josephson 'OAA in collaboration with senior leaders of the studio. The name PARTISANS represent the firm's interest in collective action and architecture as a political force for social and cultural good.

== History ==
In 2008, the founders of PARTISANS, Josephson and Baktash, were finishing their master's of architecture degree at the University of Waterloo. They became close as they consulted on each other's thesis projects, and decided to go into business together. Alex Josephson had previously worked as a sculptor and worked for the architect Massimiliano Fuksas in Rome before returning to Canada. Both founders had previously worked at larger firms, where they were unable to be creative, and soon decided to set up their shop together. Starting with small commissions from family, the pair soon started building their firm up, winning a commission from Osmington to become the lead architect of the redevelopment and expansion of Toronto’s historic Union Station’s commercial real estate “to leverage Union’s identity as a major transit hub and transform it into ‘a fluid stage for Toronto’s most ambitious culinary, cultural, design, and retail offerings." Jonathan Friedman, a licensed architect with a decade of experience in Toronto, joined the firm in 2014 as partner and left in 2022 to found his own firm.

== Publications ==
=== Graphic Novel ===
In 2014, Partisans published a graphic novel called "Suburbabylonia", a part manifesto, part satire novel. The book has the appearance of dreamy images and truth-seeking spaceman hero, but beneath the surface, the authors aim to mock an off-kilter version of a Toronto-like metropolis, destroyed by unchecked building boom and ineptitude of municipal politicians.

=== Book ===
In 2016, Hans Ibelings along with Partisans co-wrote a book called "Rise and Sprawl: The Condominiumization of Toronto". Together they tackle the criticism of Toronto's current skyline, and how the rapid growth of downtown as well as the condominium development has changed Toronto.

== Projects ==
- Grotto Sauna
- First Tower 55 Yonge (Toronto)
- Bar Raval
- Master Planning Innisfil Mobility Orbit, Garden City Plan for 50,000 new homes Ontario
- Toronto Biennial of Art
- Luminato Festival of the Arts, The Hearn
- Italian eatery Gusto 501
- revamping Union Station, Toronto’s central train terminal
