= Joe Beef (restaurant) =

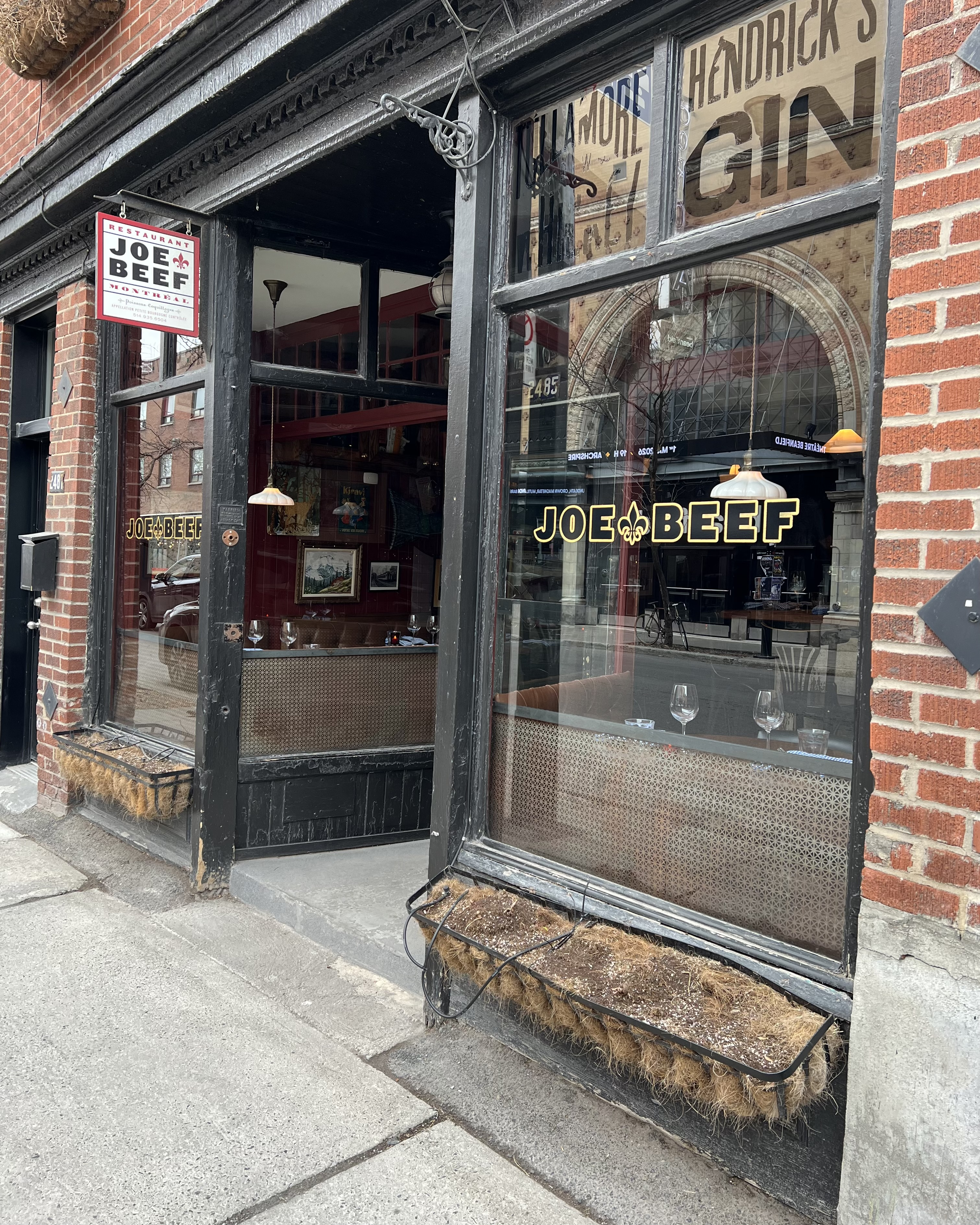

- Location within Montreal

Restaurant information
- Established: 2005
- Owners: Allison Cunningham, Frédéric Morin, Jeffrey Baikowitz and David Lisbona
- Food type: Canadian, French
- Dress code: Business casual, Formal
- Rating: Recommended (Michelin Guide)
- Location: 2491 Notre Dame Street West, Montreal, Quebec, H3J 1N6, Canada
- Coordinates: 45.482972°N 73.575126°W
- Seating capacity: 75
- Reservations: Yes
- Other information: Wheelchair accessible

Joe Beef is a restaurant in Montreal, Quebec, Canada. The owners describe the cuisine as “Bocusian-Lyonnaise cuisine du marché (French market cuisine).” It is located in the neighbourhood of Little Burgundy, in the borough of Le Sud Ouest.

== History ==
Joe Beef was opened on September 19, 2005 by David McMillan, Frederic Morin, and Allison Cunningham with financial guidance and investment by Jeff Baikowitz and David Lisbona. The restaurant took over the location of Café Miguel.

The restaurant's name is a homage to Montreal's infamous Joe Beef, an alias for Charles McKiernan. McKiernan, who owned a tavern that served many lower-class labourers in Montreal, "died in his canteen of a heart attack at the age of 54." McKiernan's generosity and gluttony may have inspired the concept of Joe Beef restaurant, which challenges the conventions of fine French dining.

As of November 25, 2021 co-founder David McMillan announced his retirement, citing burnout and stress after 32 years in the restaurant industry stating, "I never want to shave white truffles on to asparagus for someone from Toronto ever again in my life". McMillan has since sold his shares to fellow co-founders and co-partners Fred Morin and Allison Cunningham.

== Offerings ==
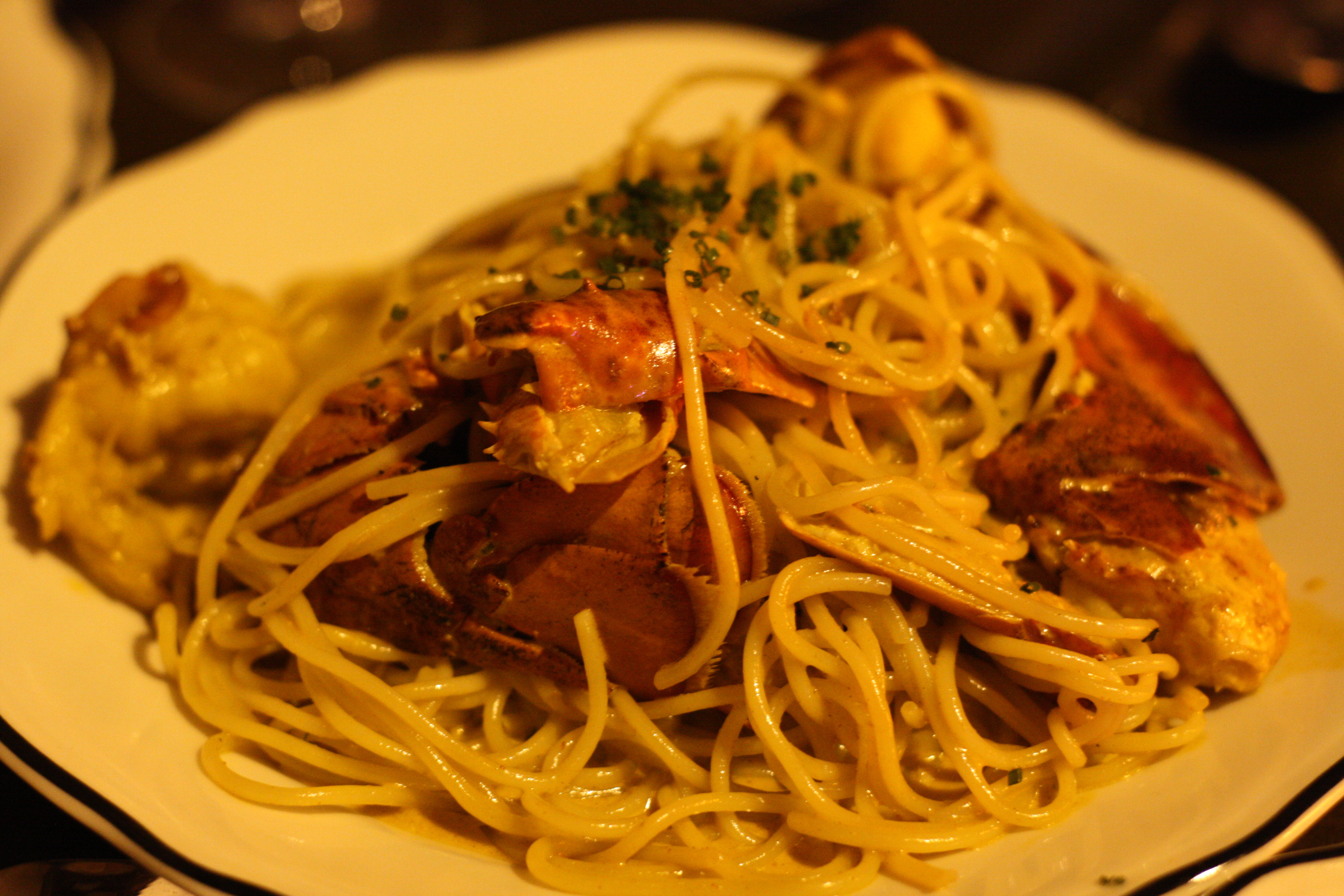
Spaghetti lobster, a popular dish at Joe Beef

The menu at Joe Beef changes every dinner service, usually according to the produce sourced from Atwater Market and other local suppliers.

== Products ==
Frederic Morin and David McMillan, along with Meredith Erickson, have released two cookbooks: The Art of Living According to Joe Beef: A Cookbook of Sorts and Joe Beef: Surviving the Apocalypse: Another Cookbook of Sorts, which won Gold at the 2019 Taste Canada Awards. The cookbooks include recipes from the restaurants and homes of the Joe Beef owners.

== Recognition ==
In 2025, the business received a 'Recommended' designation in Quebec's inaugural Michelin Guide. Per the guide, a 'Recommended' selection "is the sign of a chef using quality ingredients that are well cooked; simply a good meal" and that the anonymous inspectors had found "the food to be above average, but not quite at [Michelin star] level."

=== Canada's 100 Best Restaurants Ranking ===
Joe Beef
Year	Rank	Change
2015	10	new
2016	4	▲6
2017	3	▲1
2018	3	Steady
2019	2	▲1
2020	3	▼1
2021	No List	
2022	26	▼23
2023	24	▲2
2024	41	▼17
2025	46	▼5
2026	51	▼5
