= List of Italian restaurants =

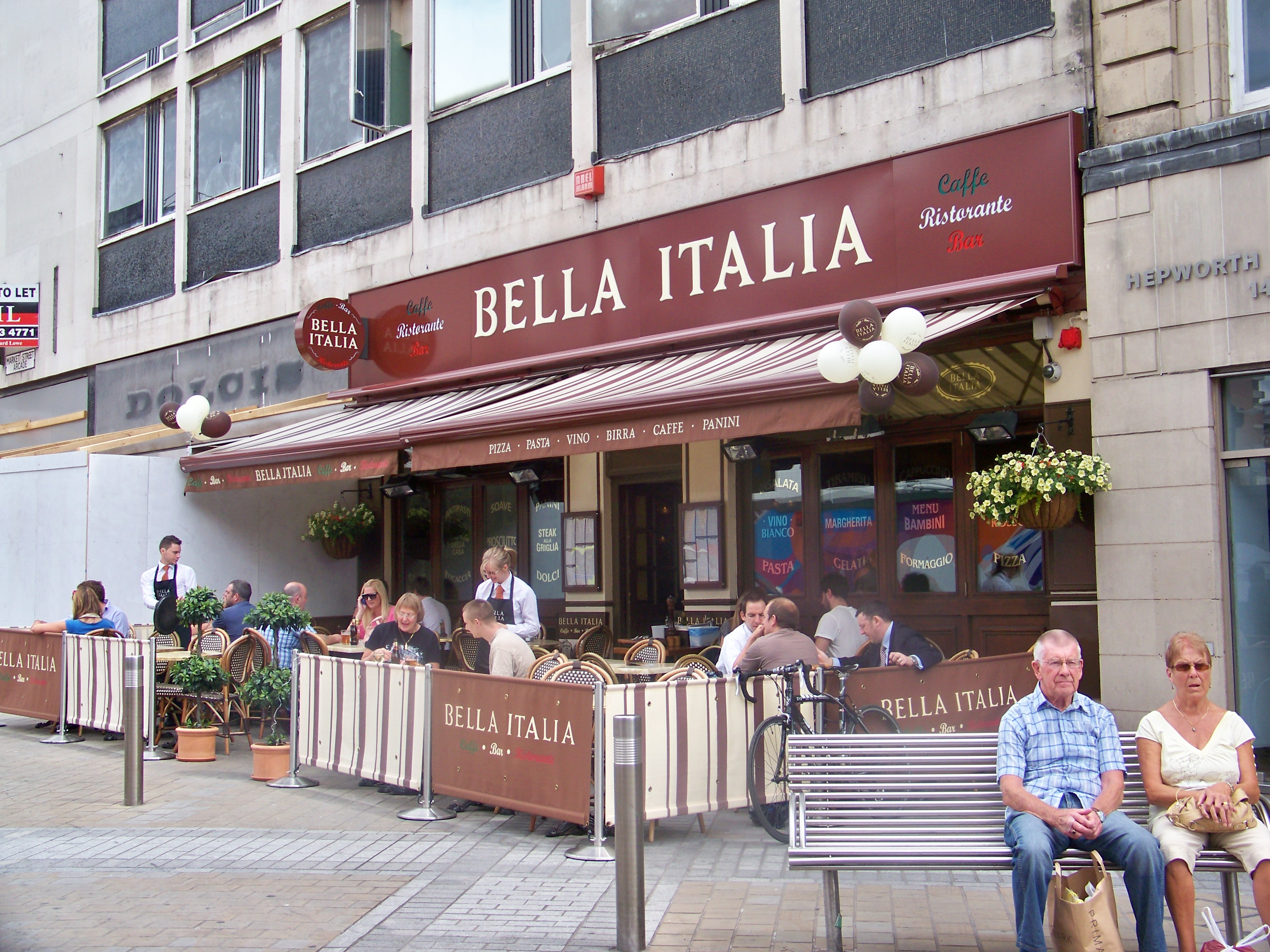
Bella Italia, Leeds, England

This is a list of notable Italian restaurants that specialize in the preparation and purveyance of Italian cuisine:

== Australia ==
- Beppi's Restaurant
- La Porchetta

== Brazil ==
- Spoleto, chain

== Canada ==
- DaNico
- Don Alfonso 1890
- East Side Mario's, chain
- Fiorino
- Kissa Tanto
- Osteria Giulia

== Germany ==
Vapiano, chain

== Italy ==
- Alfredo alla Scrofa
- Eataly, chain
- Solo Per Due

== Israel ==
- Spaghettim, chain

== Japan ==
- Italian Tomato, chain
- Saizeriya, chain

== Luxembourg ==
- Mosconi

== Singapore ==
- Pastamania, chain

== UAE ==
- Armani Ristorante
- Talea by Antonio Guida
- Torno Subito

== United Kingdom ==
- ASK Italian, chain
- Bella Italia, chain
- Frankie & Benny's, chain
- Locanda Locatelli
- Murano
- Prezzo, chain
- San Lorenzo
- The River Café (London)
- Tony Macaroni
- Union Street Café
- Zizzi – a chain of Italian restaurants found across the United Kingdom, which was owned by Gondola Group

== United States ==
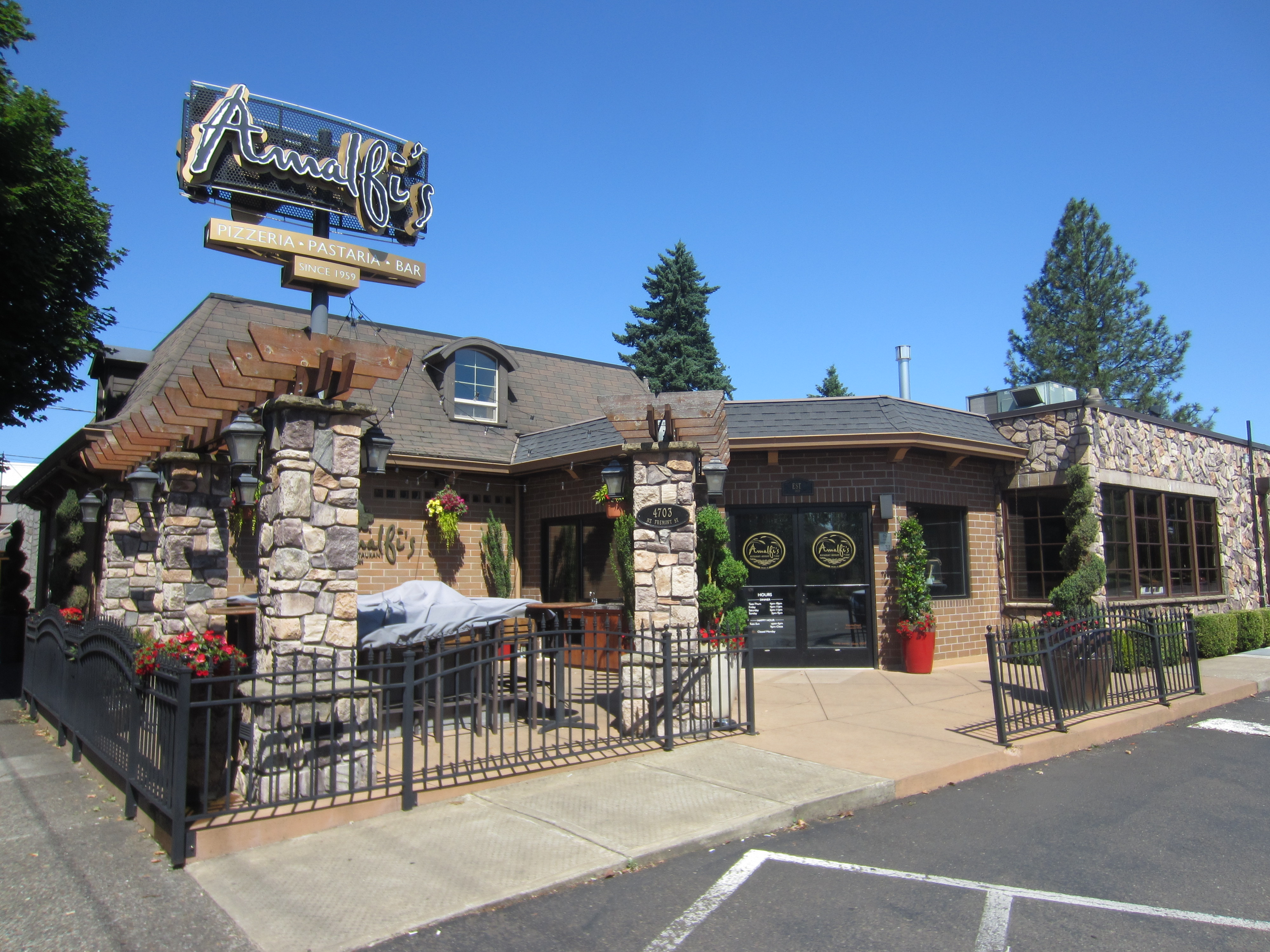
Amalfi's Italian Restaurant, Portland, Oregon

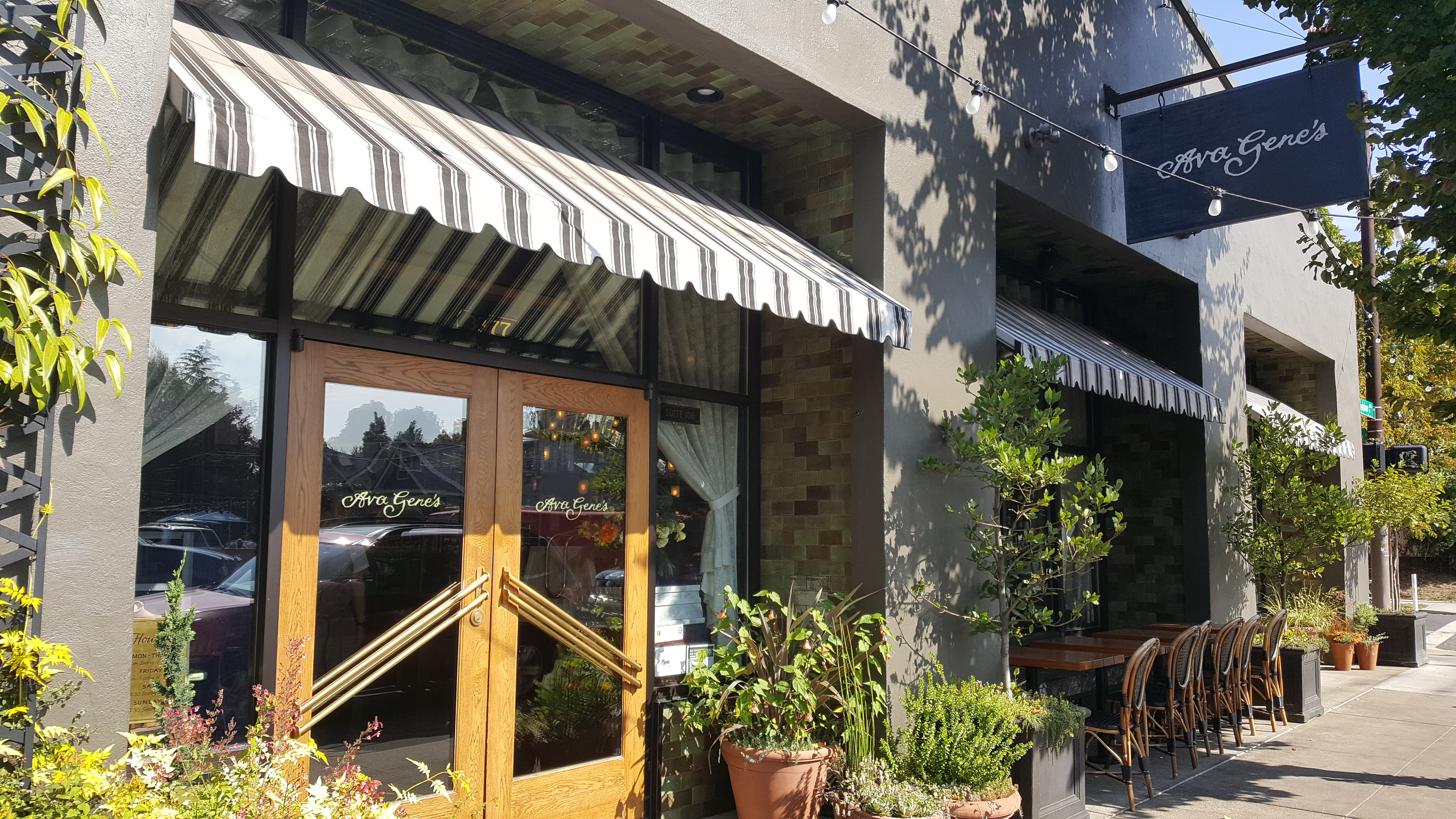
Ava Gene's, Portland, Oregon

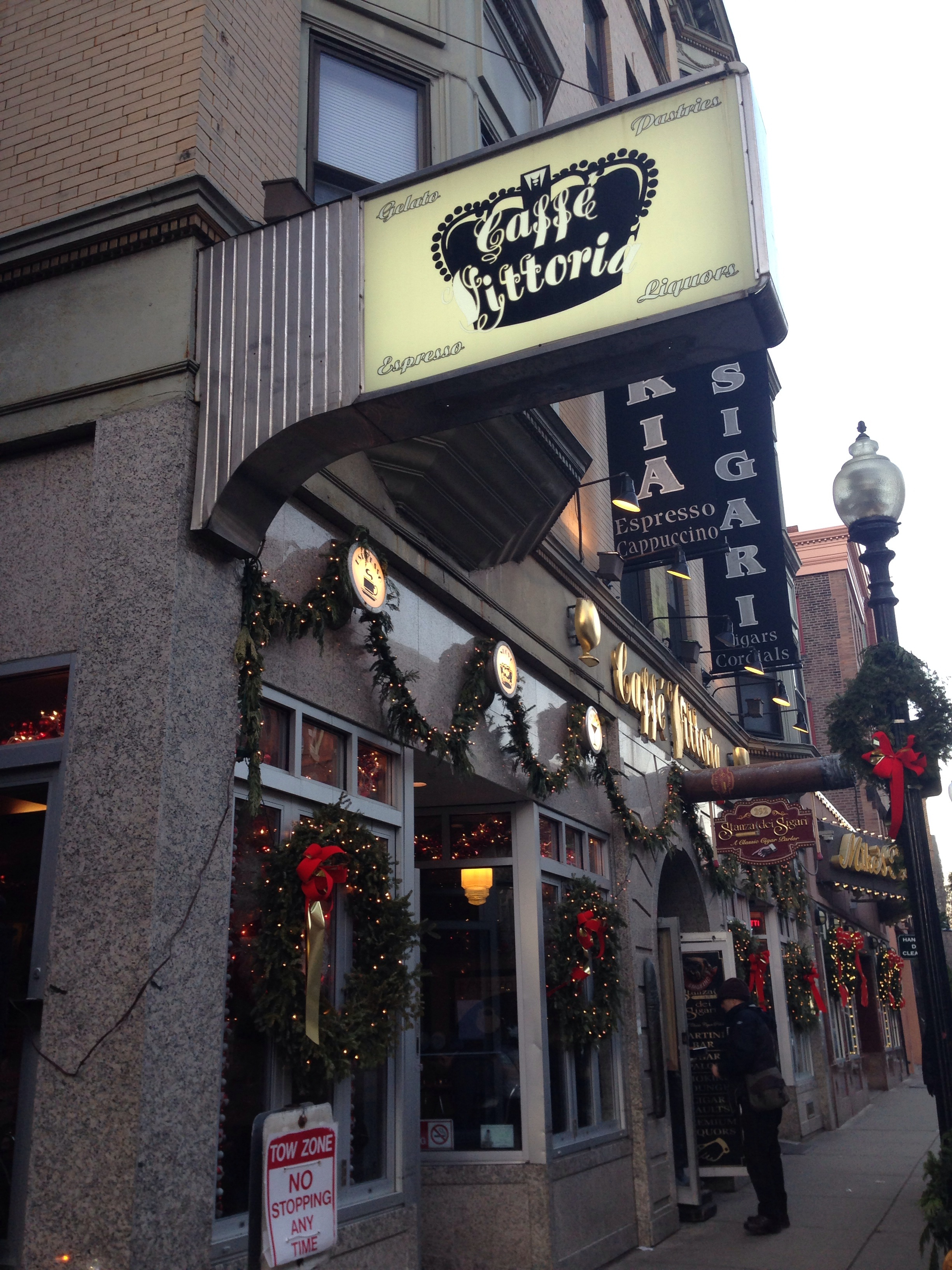
Caffé Vittoria, Boston

Filomena Ristorante, Washington, D.C.

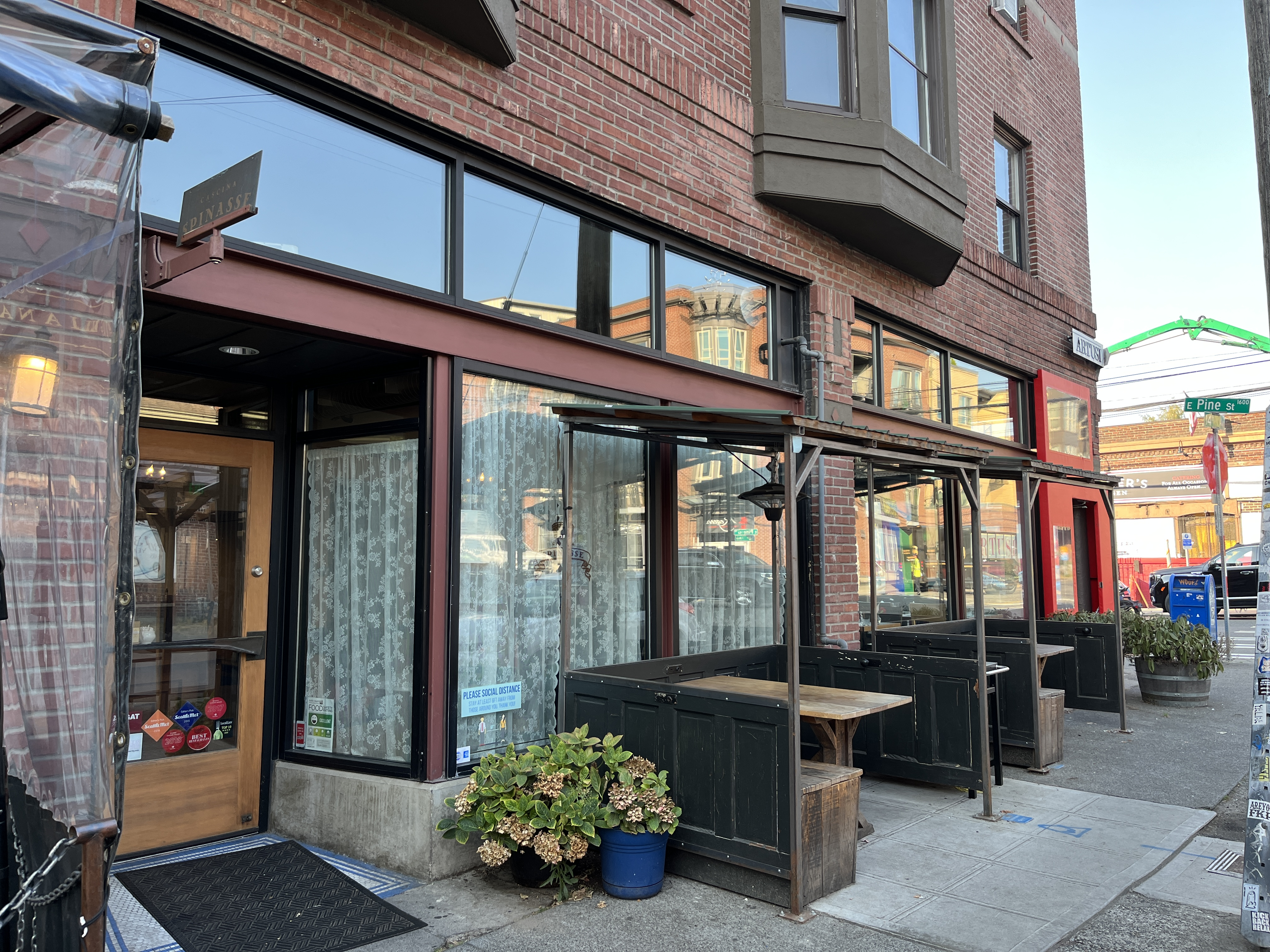
Spinasse, Seattle

Notable Italian restaurants in the United States include:

- 3 Doors Down Café and Lounge, Portland, Oregon
- Acquerello, San Francisco
- Al Coro, New York City
- Amalfi's Italian Restaurant, Portland, Oregon
- Amato's
- Angelo's Civita Farnese, Providence, Rhode Island
- Antico Nuovo
- Artusi, Seattle
- Ava Gene's, Portland, Oregon
- Babbo, New York City
- Bamonte's, Brooklyn, New York
- Bar Bacetto, Waitsburg, Washington
- Bar del Corso, Seattle
- Bar Roma, Chicago
- Barbetta, New York City, which closed for business on February 27, 2026.
- Bella's Italian Bakery, Portland, Oregon
- Benno, New York City
- Bertucci's
- BiCE Ristorante, New York City
- Bizzarro Italian Cafe, Seattle
- Boia De, Miami, Florida
- Buca di Beppo, chain
- Cafe Juanita, Kirkland, Washington
- Cafe Olli, Portland, Oregon
- Caffe Mingo, Portland, Oregon
- Caffé Vittoria, Boston
- Campana, Portland, Oregon
- Campione, Livingston, Montana
- Campisi's Egyptian Restaurant, Dallas
- Carrabba's Italian Grill, chain
- Caravaggio, New York City
- Carbone
- Carino's Italian
- Caro Amico, Portland, Oregon
- Caruso's, California
- Chef Vola's, Atlantic City, New Jersey
- Ci Siamo, New York City
- Cibo, Portland, Oregon
- Convivio, New York City
- Daisies, Chicago
- Defonte's, New York City
- Delancey, Seattle
- DeLaurenti Food & Wine, Seattle
- Del Posto, New York City
- DeNicola's, Portland, Oregon
- Dolce Vita, Houston
- Dolly Olive, Portland, Oregon
- Don Angie, New York City
- Don Peppe, Queens, New York
- Drago restaurants, chain
- The Electric Banana, Pittsburgh
- Fazoli's, chain
- Ferrara Bakery and Cafe, New York City
- Figaretti's Italian Restaurant, Wheeling, West Virginia
- Filomena Ristorante, Washington, D.C.
- Fiola, Washington, D.C.
- Foul Witch, New York City
- Francie, Brooklyn, New York City
- Frasca Food and Wine
- Gabbiano's, Portland, Oregon
- Gargiulo's Italian Restaurant, New York City
- Gelatiamo, Seattle
- Genoa, Portland, Oregon
- Gilda's Italian Restaurant, Portland, Oregon
- Gino's Restaurant and Bar
- Giorgio Baldi, Santa Monica, California
- Grassa
- Gucci Osteria da Massimo Bottura, Beverly Hills, California
- Gumba
- I Sodi, New York City
- Il Fornaio
- In Bocca al Lupo, Juneau, Alaska
- Komi, Washington, D.C.
- La Botte
- Luce, Portland, Oregon
- Lucy's Cafe
- Lusardi's, New York City
- Maggiano's Little Italy
- Mama Mia Trattoria, Portland, Oregon
- Marea, New York City
- Mario's, The Bronx, New York
- Masa of Echo Park, Los Angeles
- Monte Carlo, Portland, Oregon
- Mosca's, near New Orleans
- Mucca Osteria, Portland, Oregon
- Nick's Italian Cafe, McMinnville, Oregon
- No Saint, Portland, Oregon
- Nostrana, Portland, Oregon
- Numero 28, New York City
- Olive Garden, chain
- Osteria la Spiga, Seattle
- Osteria Mozza, Los Angeles
- Oven and Shaker, Portland, Oregon
- Pasta Pomodoro, chain
- Park Side Restaurant, Queens, New York
- Pastificio d'Oro, Portland, Oregon
- Pastini Pastaria, Oregon
- Patsy's, New York City
- Pazzo Ristorante, Portland, Oregon
- Piada Italian Street Food, chain
- Piattino, Portland, Oregon
- Piazza Italia, Portland, Oregon
- The Pink Door, Seattle
- Pizzeria Gabbiano, Seattle
- Portobello Vegan Trattoria, Portland, Oregon
- Rao's, New York City, Las Vegas, Los Angeles
- Rezdôra, New York City
- Rione XIII, Seattle
- Ristorante Machiavelli, Seattle
- Rocca, Tampa, Florida
- Roman Candle, Portland, Oregon
- Romano's Macaroni Grill, chain
- Rose Pistola, San Francisco
- Salumi, Seattle
- Salumeria Rosi Parmacotto, New York City
- Sebastiano's, Portland, Oregon
- Serafina, Seattle
- Serratto
- La Sirena, New York City
- Spaghetti Warehouse, Ohio
- Spiaggia, Chicago
- Spinasse, Seattle
- Tavolàta, Washington
- The Old Spaghetti Factory, chain
- That's Amore Italian Cafe, Seattle
- Torrisi, New York City
- Touché Restaurant & Bar, Portland, Oregon
- Tufano's Vernon Park Tap, Chicago
- Umberto's Clam House, New York City
- Valentino
- Veeno, chain
- Veniero's, New York City
- Vito's, Seattle
- Zefiro, Portland, Oregon

== See also ==
- List of pizza chains
- List of Italian foods and drinks
- List of Italian chefs
- Lists of restaurants
- Trattoria
