= Mad for Garlic =

Italian restaurant chain based in South Korea

- Industry: restaurants
- Founded: South Korea (2001)
- Headquarters: Seoul, South Korea
- Number of locations: 39 stores (2015)
- Website: Official website

Mad for Garlic (Korean: 매드포갈릭) is an Italian restaurant chain based in South Korea owned by MFG Korea. As of 2015, the chain had over 39 retail stores in South Korea and one retail store in Indonesia and Singapore.

== See also ==
- List of Italian restaurants
