= Bizzarro Italian Cafe =

Restaurant in Seattle, Washington, U.S.

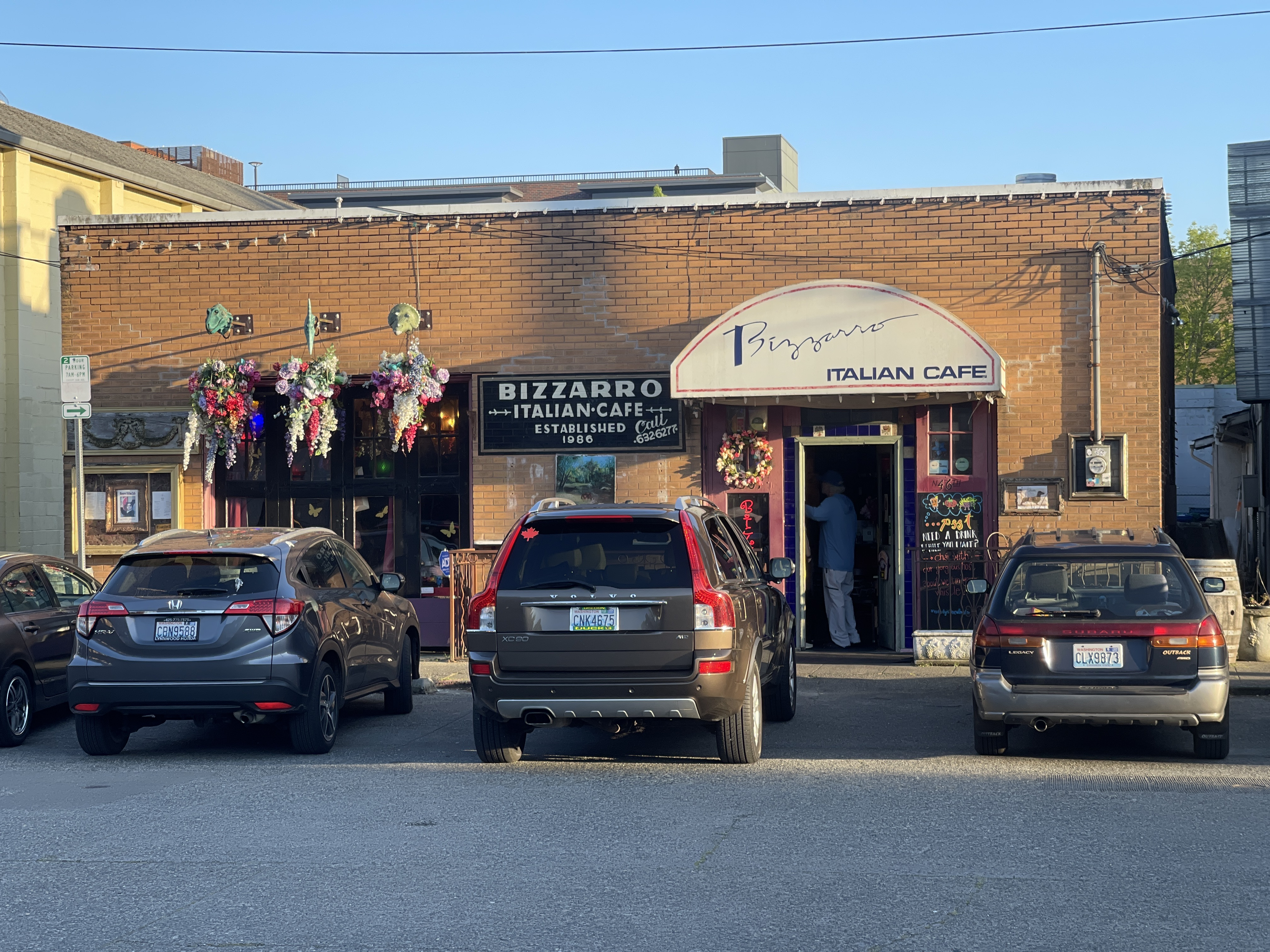
- Interactive map of Bizzarro Italian Cafe

Restaurant information
- Food type: Italian
- Location: 1307 North 46th Street, Seattle, Washington, 98103, United States
- Coordinates: 47°39′43″N 122°20′30″W
- Website: bizzarroitaliancafe.com

Bizzarro Italian Cafe is an Italian restaurant in Seattle, in the U.S. state of Washington.

Established in 1986, the business has been featured on Diners, Drive-Ins and Dives.

== See also ==
- List of Diners, Drive-Ins and Dives episodes
- List of Italian restaurants
