= Bar del Corso =

Italian restaurant in Seattle, Washington, U.S.

- Interactive map of Bar del Corso

Restaurant information
- Location: 3057 Beacon Ave S, Seattle, King, Washington, 98144, United States
- Coordinates: 47°34′31.5″N 122°18′34.5″W
- Website: bardelcorso.com

Bar del Corso is an Italian restaurant in Seattle's Beacon Hill neighborhood, in the U.S. state of Washington. Chef Jerry Corso and partner Angelina Tolentino opened the restaurant in 2011.

Located on Beacon Avenue, the restaurant has served pizza, risotto balls and cod fritters, asparagus with hazelnut sauce, and grilled octopus, as well as antipasto and seasonal salads. In 2021, Jessica Voelker and Stefan Milne included the business in Conde Nast Traveler's list of Seattle's 21 best restaurants. Additionally, Olivia Hall included Bar del Corso in Time Out Seattle's 2021 list of the city's 21 best restaurants. The Seattle Metropolitan included the business in a 2022 overview of the city's 100 best restaurants and said, "The menu is short, the waits can be long, and the aperitivi-based cocktails feel imperative."

== See also ==
- List of Italian restaurants
