= Don Angie =

Restaurant in New York City

- Interactive map of Don Angie

Restaurant information
- Established: 2017
- Food type: Italian American
- Location: 103 Greenwich Avenue, New York City, New York, 10014, United States
- Coordinates: 40°44′16″N 74°0′7.5″W

Don Angie is a restaurant in New York City's West Village, in the U.S. state of New York. Established in 2017, the restaurant serves Italian-American cuisine. The restaurant was awarded one Michelin star in 2021, but lost the star in 2023.

== See also ==
- List of Italian restaurants
- List of Michelin-starred restaurants in New York City
