= Valentino (restaurant) =

Defunct restaurant in Santa Monica, California, U.S.

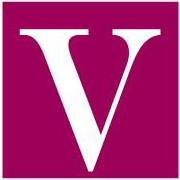
- Interactive map of Valentino

Restaurant information
- Location: 3115 Pico Boulevard, Santa Monica, California, 90405, United States
- Coordinates: 34°1′34.5″N 118°27′25.5″W

Valentino was an Italian restaurant in Santa Monica, California, United States.

== See also ==
- List of defunct restaurants of the United States
- List of Italian restaurants
- List of Michelin-starred restaurants in California
