= Caffe Mingo =

Italian restaurant in Portland, Oregon, U.S.

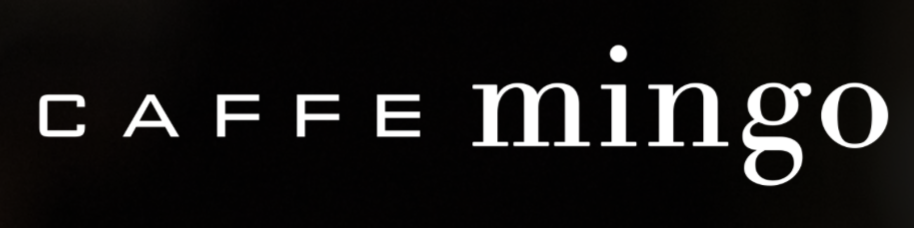

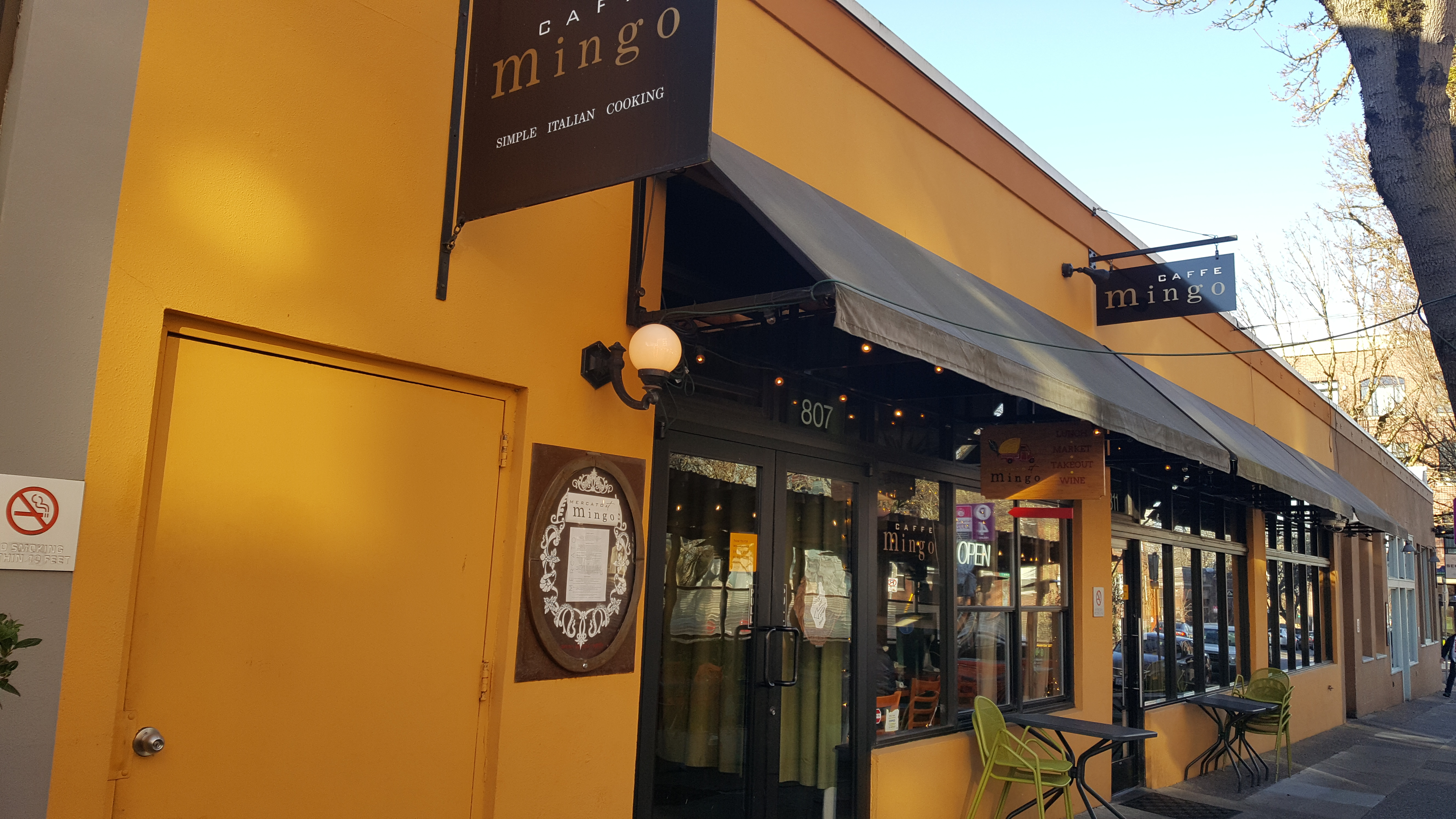
- The restaurant's exterior in 2022
- Interactive map of Caffe Mingo

Restaurant information
- Established: 1991
- Closed: 2024
- Owner: Michael Cronin
- Food type: Italian
- Location: 811 Northwest 21st Avenue, Portland, Oregon, 97209, United States
- Coordinates: 45.5288°N 122.6946°W
- Website: caffemingonw.com

Caffe Mingo was an Italian restaurant in Portland, Oregon, United States. A fire caused the restaurant to close indefinitely in 2024.

== Description ==
Caffe Mingo was an Italian restaurant on 21st Avenue in northwest Portland's Northwest District. Bar Mingo was an adjoining bar, and Mingo (also called Mingo West) is a sibling restaurant in Beaverton.

== History ==
The restaurant opened in 1991 and underwent a renovation in 2013. Caffe Mingo was owned by Michael Cronin.

== Reception ==
Giselle Smith rated the restaurant 2.5 out of 3 stars in Best Places Northwest: The Locals' Guide to the Best Restaurants, Lodgings, Sights, Shopping, and More! (2004). In 2010, David Sarasohn of The Oregonian gave Caffe Mingo a rating of 'B+' and Mingo in Beaverton a 'B' rating. Samantha Bakall included Bar Mingo in the newspaper's 2014 list of the ten best happy hours in downtown Portland. The Oregonian's Michael Russell included the bar in 2017 lists of the city's ten best Italian restaurants and northwest Portland's ten best restaurants. He later included Caffe Mingo and Bar Mingo in the newspaper's list of the 21 "most painful" restaurant and bar closures of 2024.

== See also ==
- List of Italian restaurants
