= Filomena Ristorante =

Coordinates: 38°54′15.9″N 77°3′45.4″W

- Interactive map of Filomena Ristorante

Restaurant information
- Established: 1983
- Location: Washington D.C., U.S.
- Website: filomena.com

Filomena Ristorante is an Italian-American restaurant located in the historic neighborhood of Georgetown in Washington, D.C. It opened along Washington's C&O Canal in 1983. Fresh pasta is made by Filomena's ‘Pasta Mamas’ in the storefront kitchen. They greet patrons as they enter the restaurant.

== Décor ==
The décor has been described as everything from overdone to wonderfully warm and reminiscent of going to grandma's home. The marble statues, traditional artwork, large plants, and antique furnishing convey an ambiance of old-world experience. For holidays, the restaurant is elaborately decorated, including a huge floor-to-ceiling Christmas tree with thousands of lights and ornaments.

== Patrons ==
The restaurant is frequently visited by dignitaries such as former presidents George H. W. Bush and Bill Clinton, former President Joe Biden, former Secretary of State Hillary Clinton, foreign leaders, government officials, stars of stage and screen, world-class athletes, as well as all-American heroes like airline captain Chesley Sullenberger.

Framed picture on a wall within Filomena Ristorante, commemorating the visit of President Bill Clinton and Chancellor Helmut Kohl.

On March 26, 1993, President Bill Clinton welcomed German Chancellor Helmut Kohl to the White House. In a conversation between the two leaders during a photo opportunity in the Oval Office, Kohl stated: “Every time I come here [U.S.], I usually arrive in the evening, so I go to the Filomena.” The Chancellor continued to say, “Perhaps when I come back, we could do it the two of us, because you seem to like that cuisine too, don’t you?” “Yes I do” President Clinton responded. “Too much.” On January 31, 1994, President Clinton and Chancellor Kohl conducted a working lunch at Filomena Ristorante. They discussed developments in Russia, Central Europe, the Middle East, as well as decisions made at a recent NATO summit Both leaders met again for dinner at the restaurant on June 3, 1997. Helmut Kohl has been a regular visitor since the restaurant opened in 1983.

== Awards ==
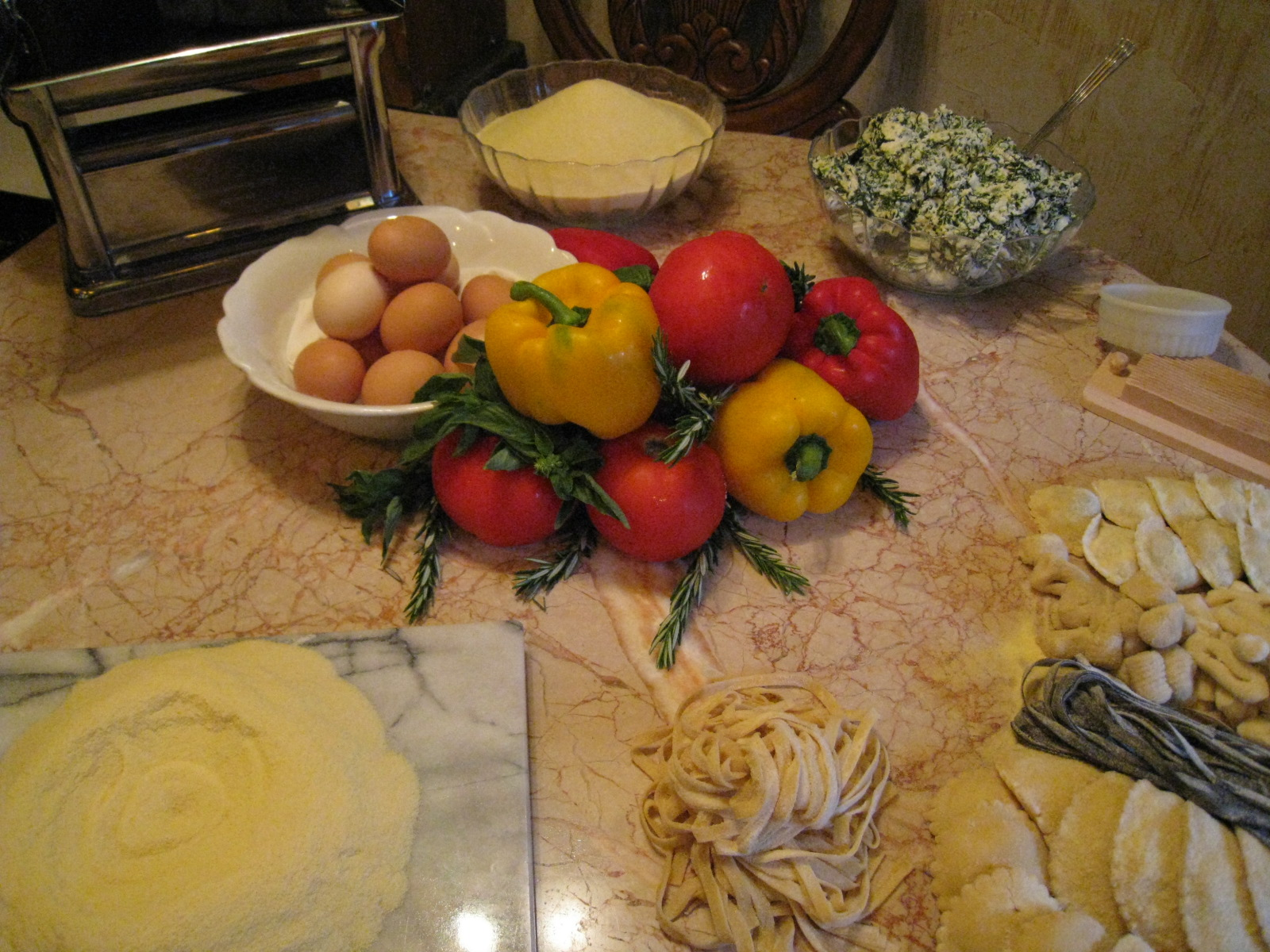
Fresh ingredients used in the Filomena storefront 'Pasta Mama' kitchen. Filomena Ristorante has won numerous awards.

Zagat Survey named it one of the "Top 1000 Italian Restaurants" in the United States and Washingtonian magazine a “Top 3 Italian Restaurant in Washington” and "Best Pasta."

== See also ==
- List of Italian restaurants
