= Delancey (restaurant) =

Pizzeria in Seattle, Washington, U.S.

- Interactive map of Delancey

Restaurant information
- Established: 2009
- Owners: Brandon Pettit; Molly Wizenberg
- Chef: Brandon Pettit
- Food type: Italian
- Location: 1415 NW 70th Street, Seattle, King, Washington, United States
- Coordinates: 47°40′46″N 122°22′29″W

Delancey is a pizzeria in Seattle's Ballard neighborhood, in the U.S. state of Washington. The business is owned by former spouses Brandon Pettit (who is also the chef) and Molly Wizenberg.

== Description ==
The wood-fired pizzeria Delancey operates in Ballard, Seattle. The Brooklyn pizza has tomato sauce, mozzarella, grana. Other pizza toppings include bacon, basil, mushrooms, fennel pork sausage, Kalamata olives, and caramelized Walla Walla sweet onions. The restaurant also serves small plates such as burrata with flatbread and olive oil, and the Jersey Salad with romaine lettuce, shaved carrots, and Grana Padano. Delancey has chocolate chip cookies with sea salt, and a small wine list. The drink menu also includes beer, cocktails, ginger beer, and sodas.

== History ==
The restaurant opened in 2009. A pantry was added in 2011.

== See also ==
- List of Italian restaurants
