= Convivio (restaurant) =

Defunct Italian restaurant in New York City

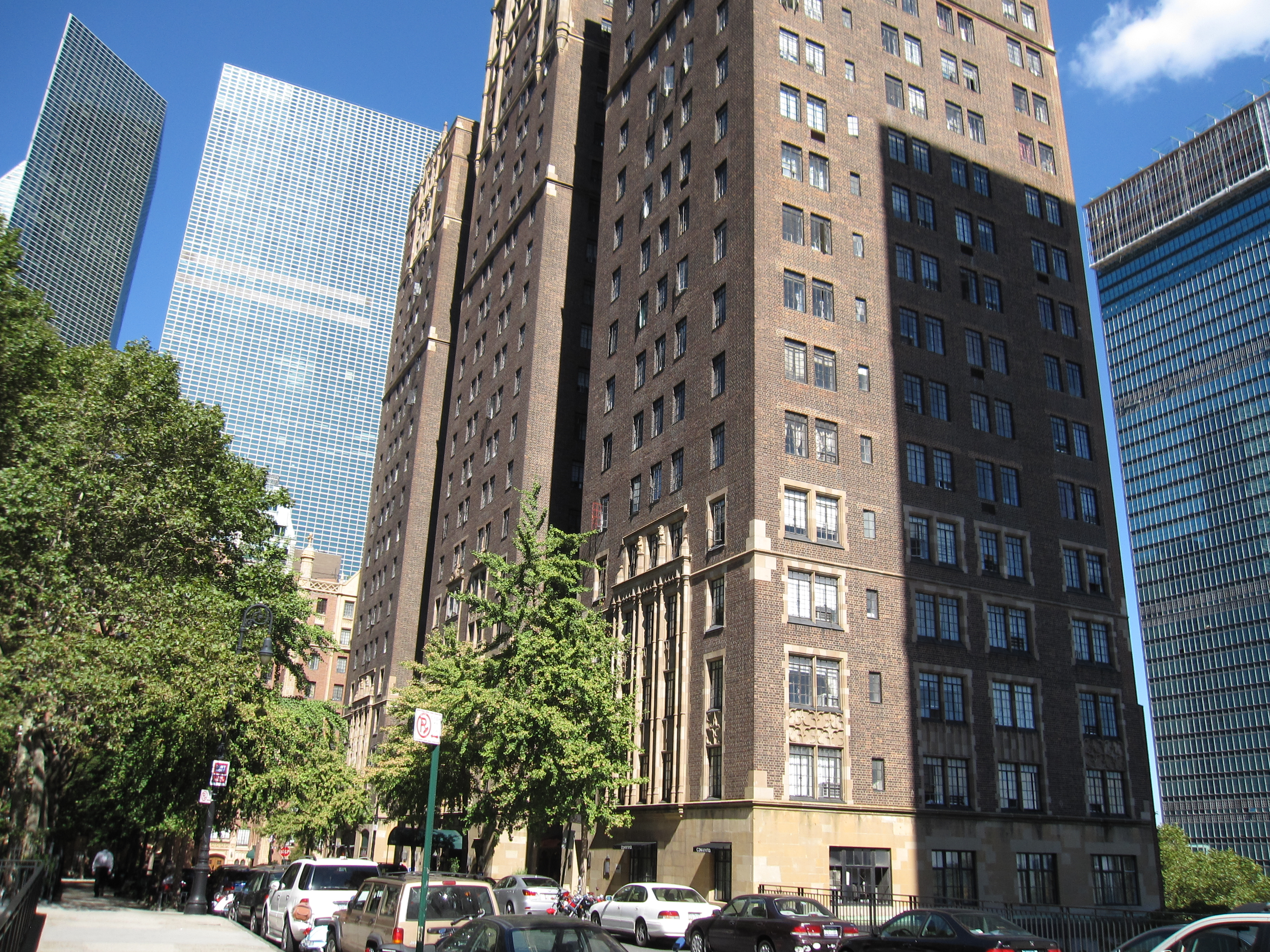
- 45 Tudor City Place in 2010, showing the restaurant's exterior at street level
- Interactive map of Convivio

Restaurant information
- Established: 2008
- Closed: March 4, 2011
- Food type: Italian
- Location: 45 Tudor City Place, New York City, New York, 10017, United States
- Coordinates: 40°44′57.2″N 73°58′12.6″W

Convivio was a restaurant located in the Tudor City apartment complex on the East Side of Manhattan in New York City. The Southern Italian menu included lasagna, pork sausage, and grilled swordfish. The restaurant had received a Michelin star.

== See also ==
- List of defunct restaurants of the United States
- List of Italian restaurants
- List of Michelin-starred restaurants in New York City
