= Amalfi's Italian Restaurant =

Italian-American restaurant in Portland, Oregon

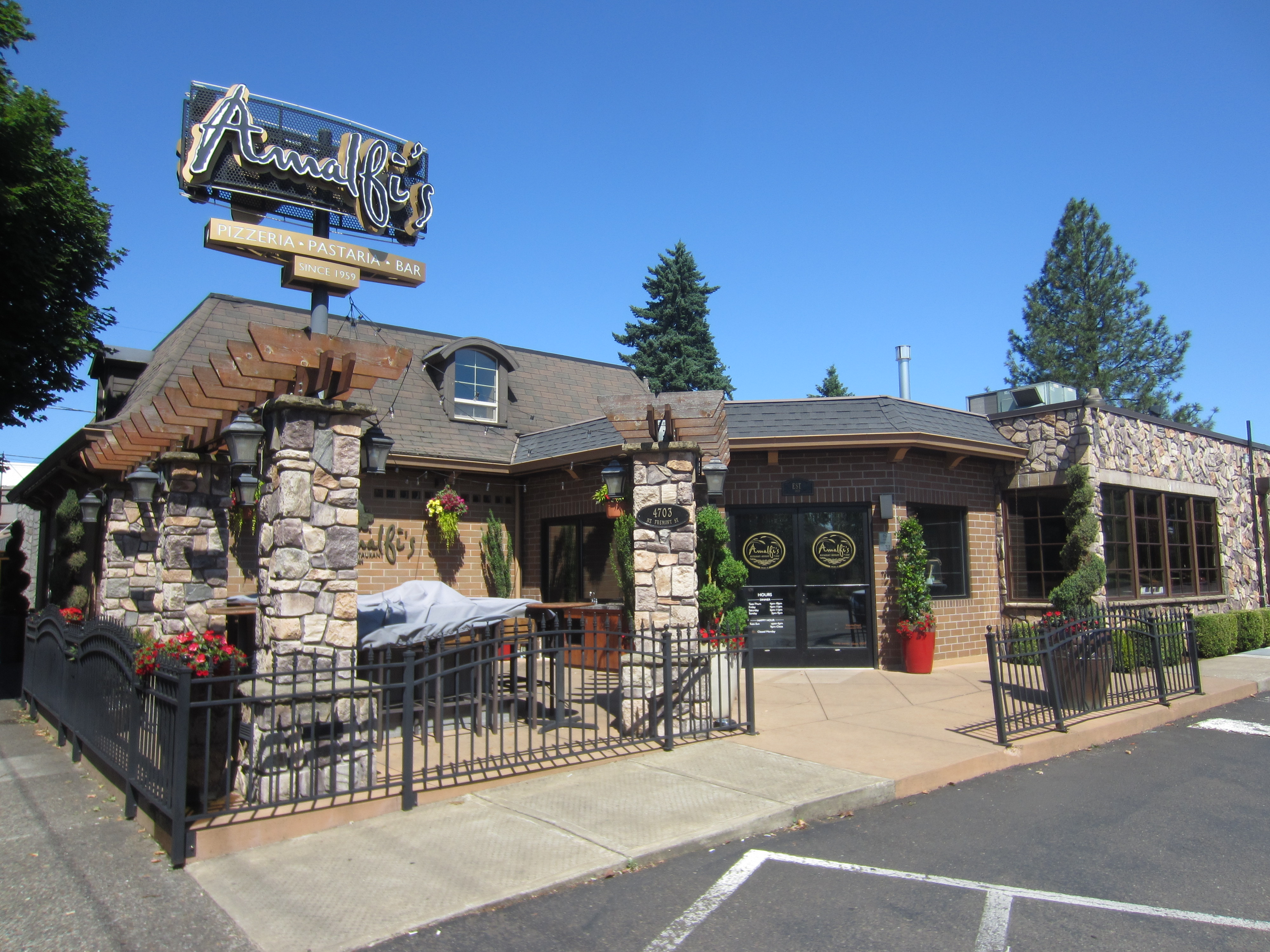
- The restaurant's exterior, 2019
- Interactive map of Amalfi's Italian Restaurant

Restaurant information
- Established: 1959
- Owner: Kiauna Floyd
- Food type: Italian-American
- Location: 4703 Northeast Fremont Street, Portland, Multnomah, Oregon, 97213, United States
- Coordinates: 45.5484°N 122.6148°W

Amalfi's Italian Restaurant, also known as Amalfi's Restaurant and Mercato, is an Italian-American restaurant in Portland, Oregon, United States.

== Description ==
Amalfi's is a Black-owned restaurant serving Italian cuisine on Fremont Street in northeast Portland's Cully neighborhood. The menu includes pizza and lasagna. The restaurant hosts live music regularly. PDX Rosie, a mural depicting a Black woman posing like Rosie the Riveter, is painted on the restaurant's exterior.

== History ==
Amalfi's was established in 1959. Kiauna Floyd has owned the restaurant since 2006. She commissioned PDX Rosie in 2020. The business used a large tent in the parking lot for outdoor seating during the COVID-19 pandemic (2020–2021).

== Reception ==
In Thrillist's 2018 overview of "How to Find the Weird Old Portland Behind the New Hipster Portlandia", Kashann Kilson said Amalfi's "has been Portland's best Italian restaurant for more than half a century".

== See also ==
- List of Black-owned restaurants
- List of Italian restaurants
