= Touché Restaurant & Bar =

Defunct Italian restaurant in Portland, Oregon, U.S.

Touché Restaurant and Bar

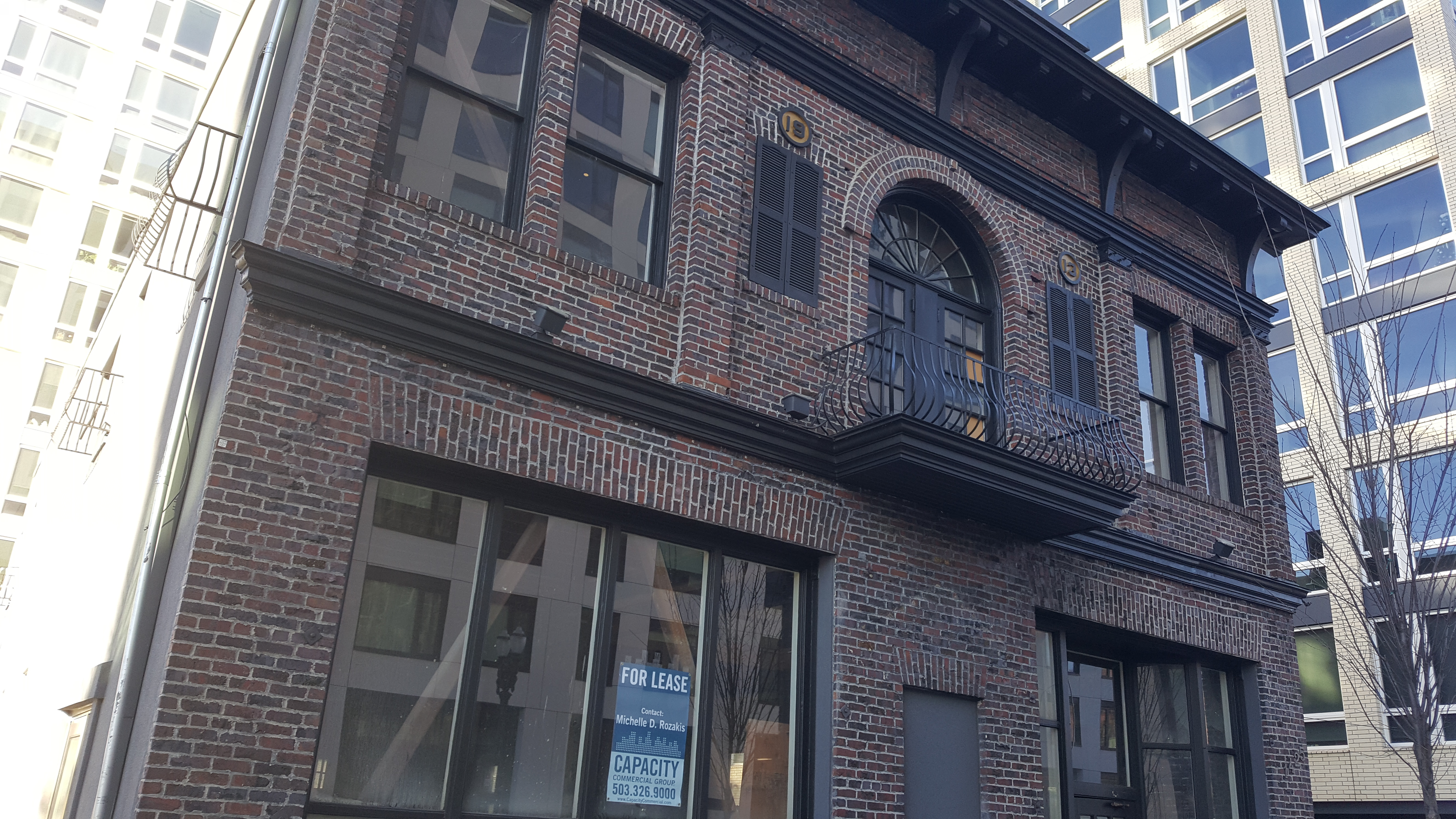
- The building which housed the restaurant, 2022
- Interactive map of Touché Restaurant and Bar

Restaurant information
- Established: 1995
- Closed: May 14, 2017
- Food type: Italian
- Location: 1425 Northwest Glisan Street, Portland, Multnomah, Oregon, 97209, United States
- Coordinates: 45.52667°N 122.68591°W

Touché Restaurant and Bar, or simply Touché, was an Italian restaurant in Portland, Oregon's Pearl District, in the United States. Established by Frank Ernandes in 1995, the restaurant was housed in a former fire station and became known for its wood-fired pizzas and pasta.

In 2016, plans emerged for a developer to replace the building, along with others, to build a new 12-story apartment building. Touché closed in May 2017.

== Description ==
Touché was a "Mediterranean-influenced" Italian restaurant. Downstairs was a combined dining area and bar, and upstairs was a billiard hall with six tables, as well as backgammon, darts and Lotto. It was housed in a former fire station, built in 1913, and located on a 5,000-square-foot lot at the intersection of 14th Avenue and Glisan Street in Northwest Portland's Pearl District.

The restaurant became known for its wood-fired pizzas and pasta entrees, operating as late as 4 am. The appetizer menu included fried calamari with capers, chili flakes, garlic, parsley and fresh citrus juices. Entrees included lamb papadelle and grilled lamb with walnut hot sauce. The happy hour menu had gyros.

== History ==
=== Building ===
The firehouse was listed on the City of Portland's Historic Resource Inventory for its 20th-century Italian Renaissance architecture and historic importance. According to the Historic Resource Inventory, the building was designed for Engine and Truck Company #3 and was "one of four stations of similar design erected on the west side, all designed by Battalion Chief Lee Holden, father of the gas-driven fire boat. This station was originally designed for horse-drawn apparatus and was remodeled later to accommodate mechanized fire equipment." In 1967, the station was sold and the building served as a warehouse and freight outlet.

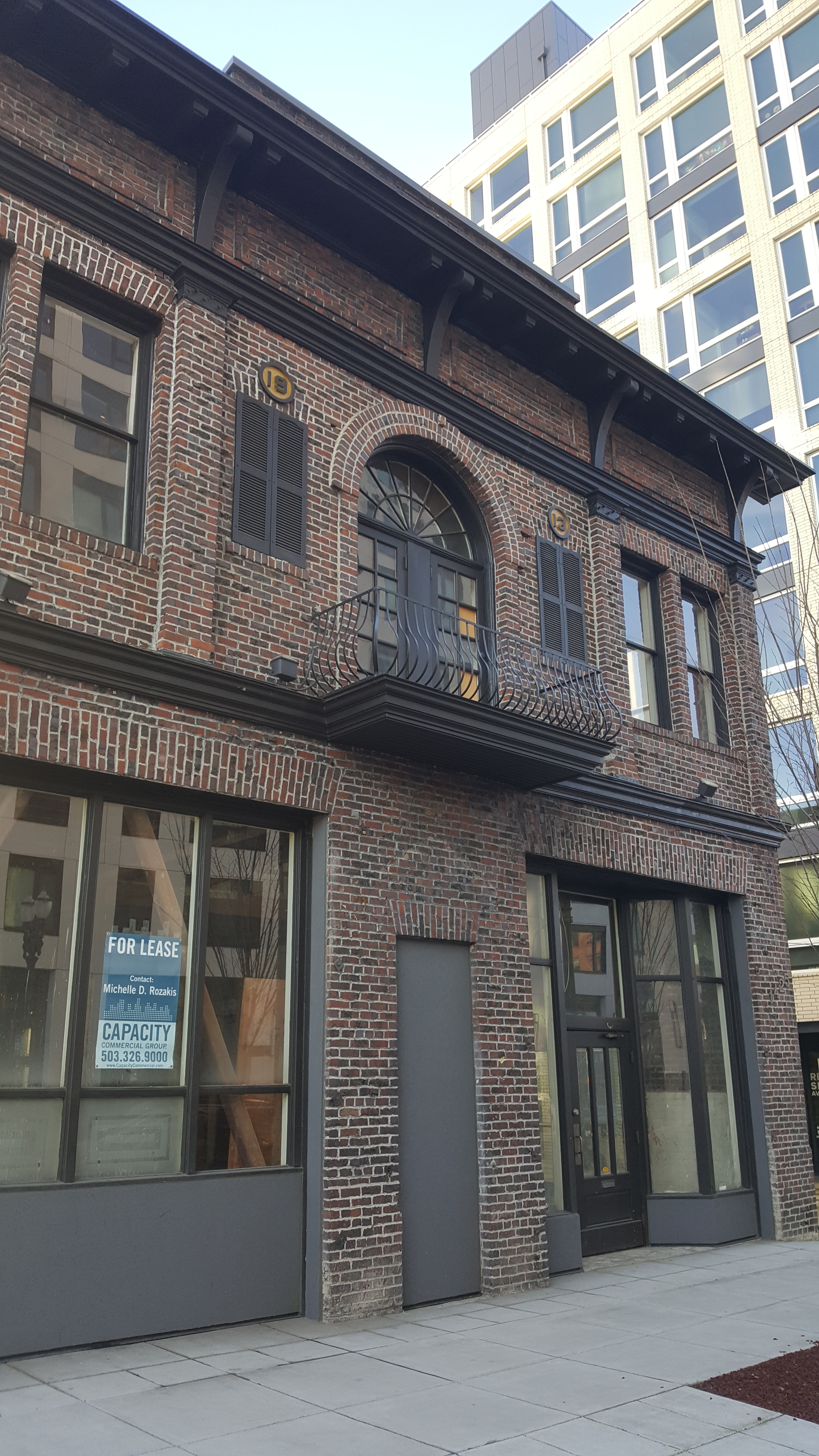
The building which housed the restaurant and once served as a fire station, 2022

The building later housed Delevan's, described as the "hottest, hippest jazz joint in town", and Remo's. In 1989, David Sarasohn and Karen Brooks of The Oregonian said:

In 1980, with innocence, arrogance, optimism and obsessiveness, Portlander Tony Arnerich spent a small fortune converting an old firehouse ... into Portland's first fashion-forward restaurant. Almost overnight, the restaurant blossomed into a hip den of hot jazz, huevos rancheros and high art. Portland's first truly eclectic menu was born here. Delevan's was the first to mingle ethnic flavors with New American cooking notions and Northwest ingredients. But despite its trend-setter status, Delevan's closed only a few years later.

The Italian restaurant Remo's operated from 1983 until its foreclosure in 1991. Food such as pasta and desserts were served in the dining room upstairs; the downstairs lounge hosted jazz nightly. Sarasohn said of the restaurant: "For several years, Remo's has been one of Portland's foremost outlets of jazz Genoese, with nightly sessions downstairs in the lounge and more formal dining upstairs. The renovation of a Portland firehouse, originally turned into Delevan's, is impressively done, missing only some wiring to permit the downstairs music to make it upstairs."

Portland's first restaurant to serve wood-fired Italian pizzas, Perlina, opened in the building in 1992. Giuliano Hazan, son of Marcella Hazan, was Perlina's chef. In 1995, Jonathan Nicholas of The Oregonian said Perlina "was launched on the reputation of a high-profile chef, Giuliano Hazan. Then it sank. This time around, owners are taking a different approach... Renamed Touche, Perlina has been pared down to 'pasta, pizza and pool.' It just opened for dinners, seven nights each week, with a lunch trade set to follow by August".

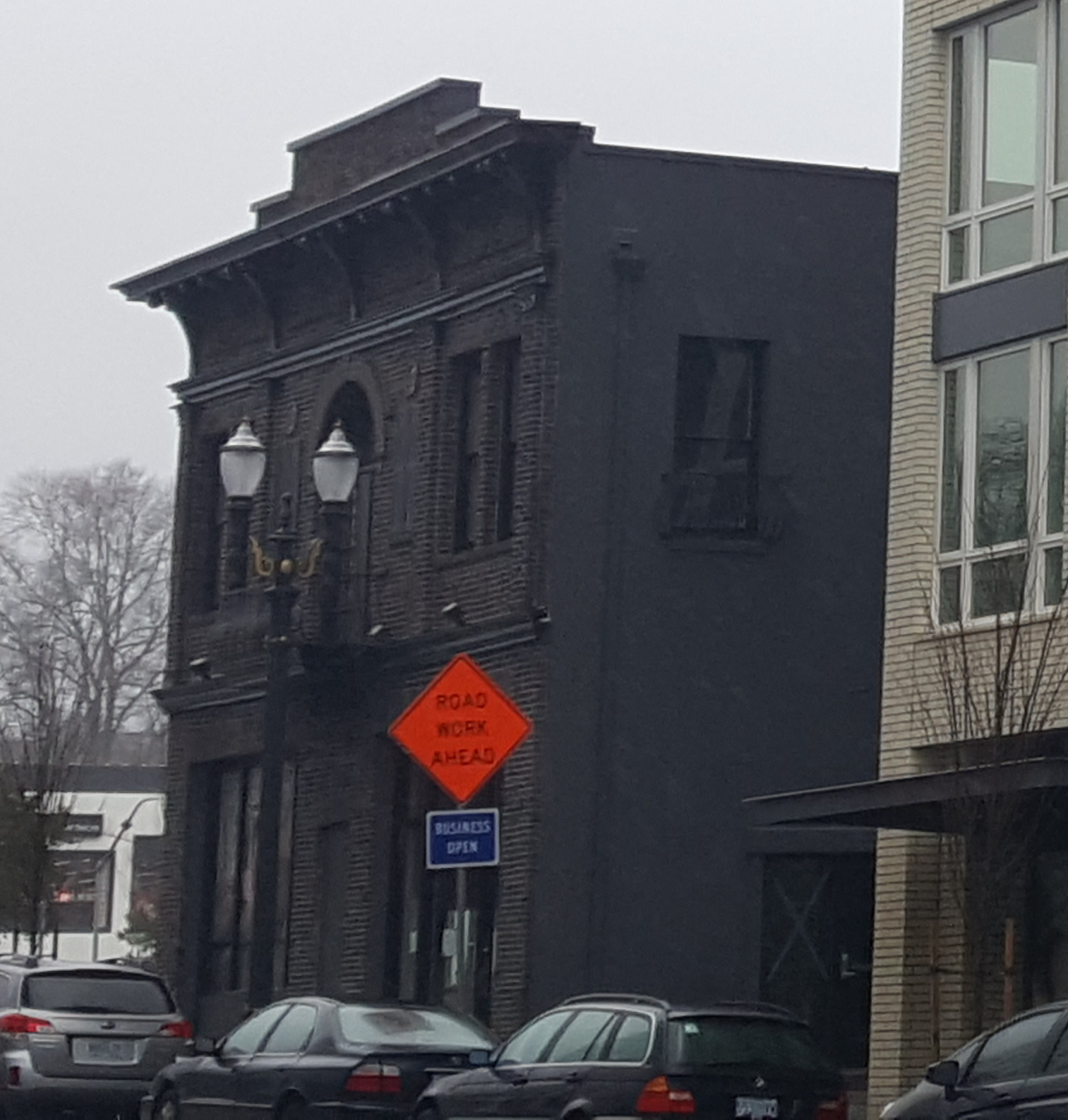
The building's exterior in 2021

Robert Ames and James Puckett owned the building, as of 2016. In 2016, The Oregonian said the building's "interior is so altered, its original occupants wouldn't recognize the place if they arrived in its lobby by way of time travel, though they may be pleased to sit down and have a meal at the restaurant, Touché, which now fills the space".

=== Touché ===
Frank Ernandes (or Ernandez) established Touché in 1995. Jazz singer Nancy King performed there weekly as of 2012.

In April 2016, Touché's general manager confirmed a developer's plans to demolish the former firehouse, along with two neighboring restaurants, and construct a 12-story apartment building in its place. The demolition did not come to fruition. In June 2016, The Oregonian said the building "will remain standing after all, as a developer has altered plans to replace it with market-rate apartments".

In an online post, the restaurant's staff confirmed its last day would be May 14, 2017:

Our wonderful run is coming to an end. We have been faithfully serving food and booze in the Pearl for over 20 years, long before the boom of condos and apartments that is unfortunately pushing us out. We are working on finding a new location, but in the meantime, come down and see us while you can. We love you, and thanks for the two decades of love and support.

== Reception ==
In 2001, Rod Patterson of The Oregonian said, "The sign outside says it all. Or most of it: late-night dining. The Touche story, though, as told on the menu, is one of fair prices and food that isn't froufrou, where you can get a five-course dinner or just a pizza." In articles about the building's possible demolition, Eater Portland's Chad Walsh said Touché has "long been a service industry hangout where servers, bartenders, and line cooks would unwind after being on their feet all night ... thanks to its second-story billiards lounge". In 2017, the website's Mattie John Bamman wrote, "With Touché, Portland loses one of the more unique nightlife opportunities in the city: a robust Italian restaurant and bar with an expansive, second-story billiards room atop a spiral staircase."

== See also ==
- List of Italian restaurants
