= Foul Witch =

Italian restaurant in New York City

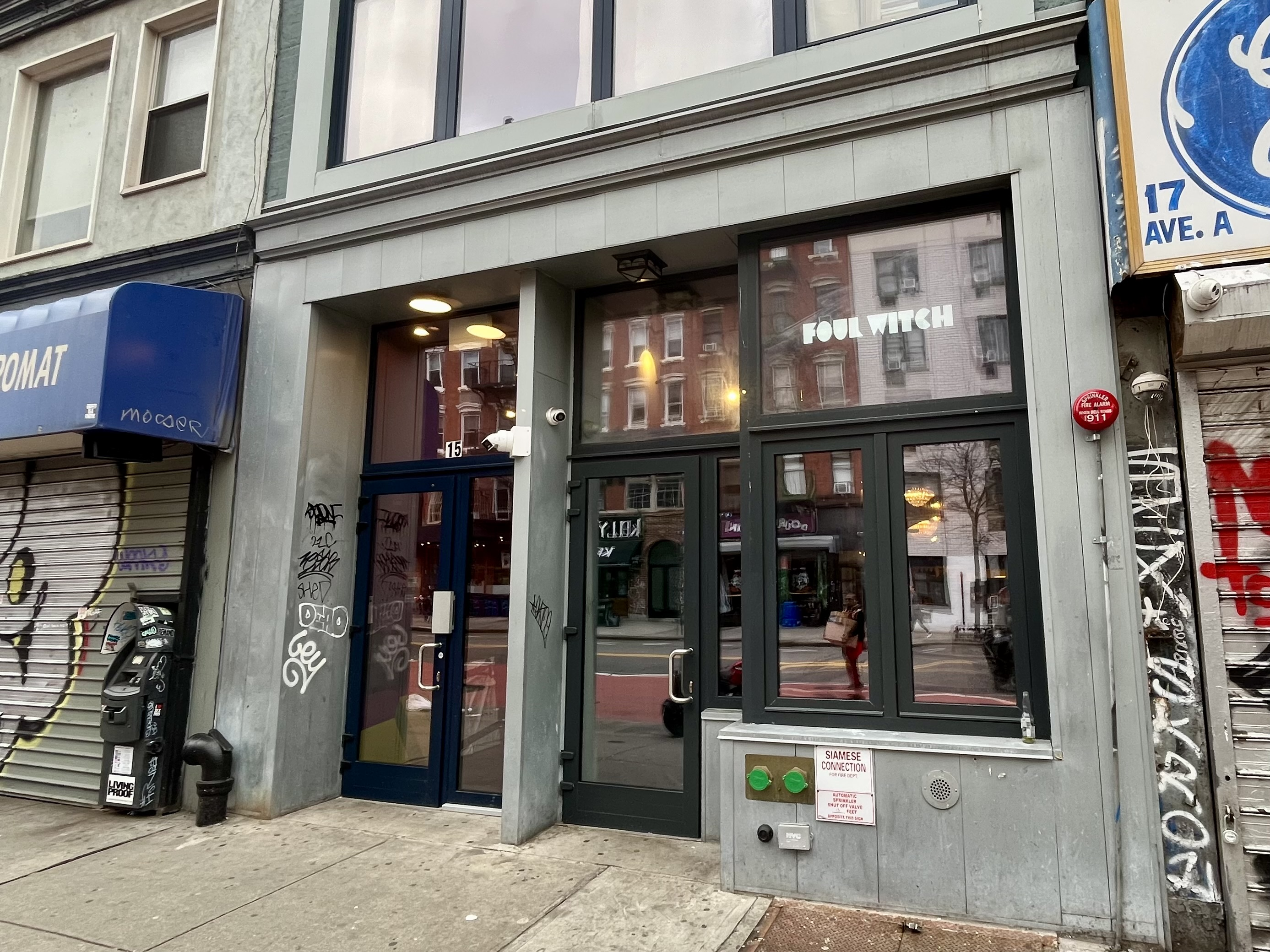
- Foul Witch in January 2024
- Interactive map of Foul Witch

Restaurant information
- Established: January 2023
- Food type: Italian
- Location: 15 Avenue A, New York City, New York, 10009, United States
- Coordinates: 40°43′22″N 73°59′10″W
- Website: foulwitchnyc.com

Foul Witch is a restaurant in the East Village neighborhood of Manhattan in New York City. The restaurant serves Italian cuisine.

== History ==
The restaurant opened in January 2023.

== Reception ==
The New York Times included Foul Witch in a 2023 list of the city's twelve best new restaurants. Time Out New York rated the restaurant three out of five stars. Foul Witch was a semifinalist in the Best New Restaurant category of the James Beard Foundation Awards in 2024. Pete Wells placed Foul Witch in fifty-third place in his 2024 ranking of the hundred best restaurants in New York City.

== See also ==
- List of Italian restaurants
