= La Sirena (restaurant) =

Italian restaurant in New York City, U.S.

- Interactive map of La Sirena

Restaurant information
- Established: 2016
- Closed: 2018
- Head chef: Mario Batali
- Location: 88 Ninth Avenue, New York City, New York, 10011, United States
- Coordinates: 40°44′33″N 74°0′14″W

La Sirena was an Italian restaurant in New York City. The business operated from 2016 to 2018.

== See also ==
- List of defunct restaurants of the United States
- List of Italian restaurants
- List of Michelin-starred restaurants in New York City
