= Pizzeria Gabbiano =

Defunct restaurant in Seattle, Washington, U.S.

- Interactive map of Pizzeria Gabbiano

Restaurant information
- Food type: Italian
- Location: Seattle, King, Washington, United States
- Coordinates: 47.6003°N 122.3311°W

Pizzeria Gabbiano was an Italian restaurant and pizzeria in Seattle, Washington. It closed in 2016.

== Description ==
The pizzeria operated in Pioneer Square. It had a seating capacity of 36 people.

== See also ==
- List of defunct restaurants of the United States
- List of Italian restaurants
