= Cafe Juanita =

Italian restaurant in Kirkland, Washington, U.S.

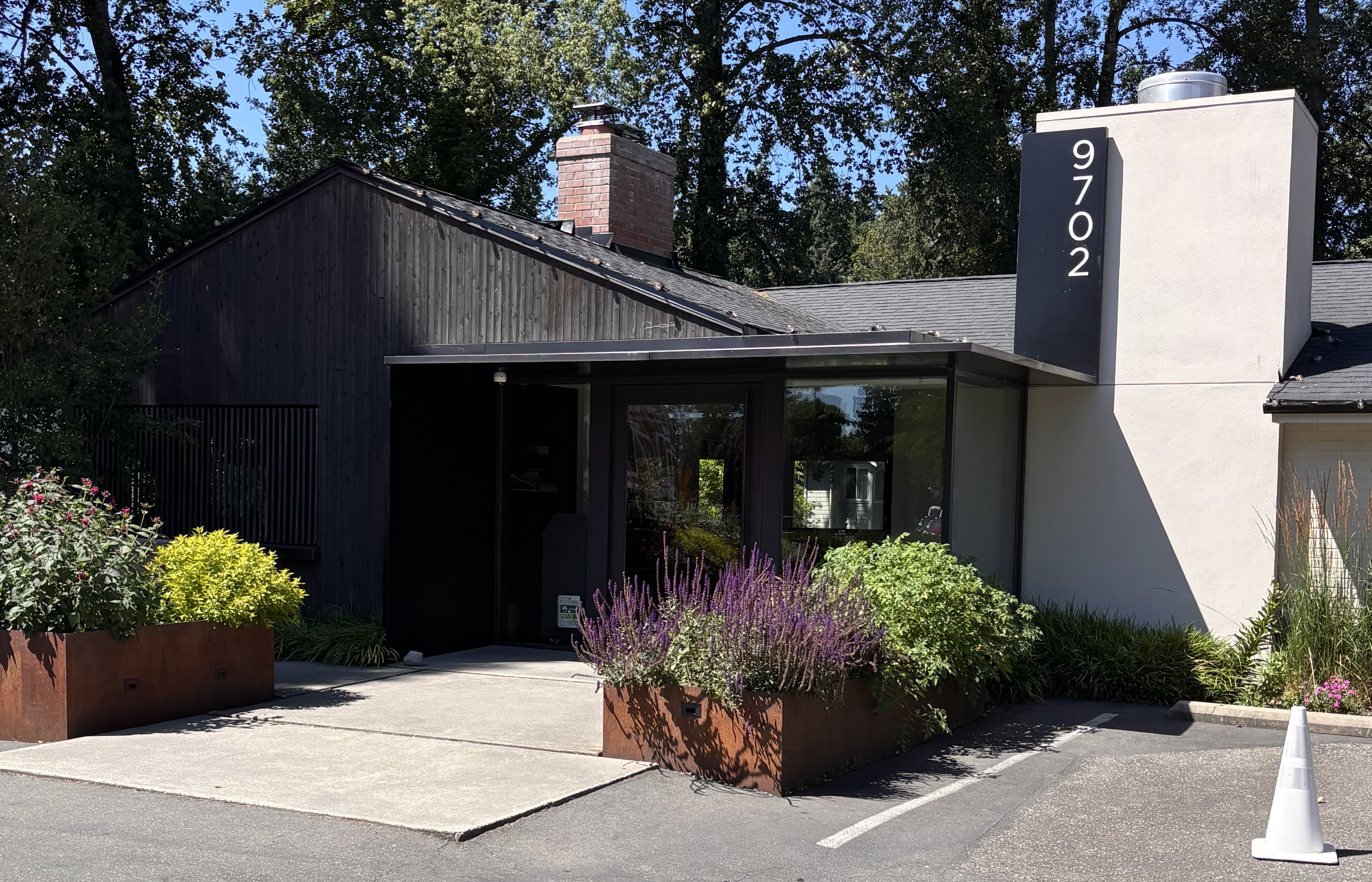
- The exterior of the restaurant, 2025
- Interactive map of Cafe Juanita

Restaurant information
- Established: 2000
- Owner: Holly Smith
- Head chef: Holly Smith
- Food type: Italian
- Location: Kirkland, Washington, United States
- Coordinates: 47°42′28″N 122°12′45″W
- Website: cafejuanita.com

Cafe Juanita is an Italian restaurant in Kirkland, Washington. The business and chef/owner Holly Smith have been recognized by the James Beard Foundation Awards.

== Description ==
Cafe Juanita has a meat- and seafood-focused menu and an extensive wine list. The restaurant served lamb with green beans, bagna cauda sauce and thyme-roasted blackberries, as well as housemade pastas, heirloom tomato-burrata salads, and desserts.

== History ==
Chef and owner Holly Smith opened Cafe Juanita in 2000. The restaurant was remodeled in 2015.

== See also ==
- List of Italian restaurants
