= Piazza Italia (restaurant) =

Italian restaurant in Portland, Oregon, U.S.

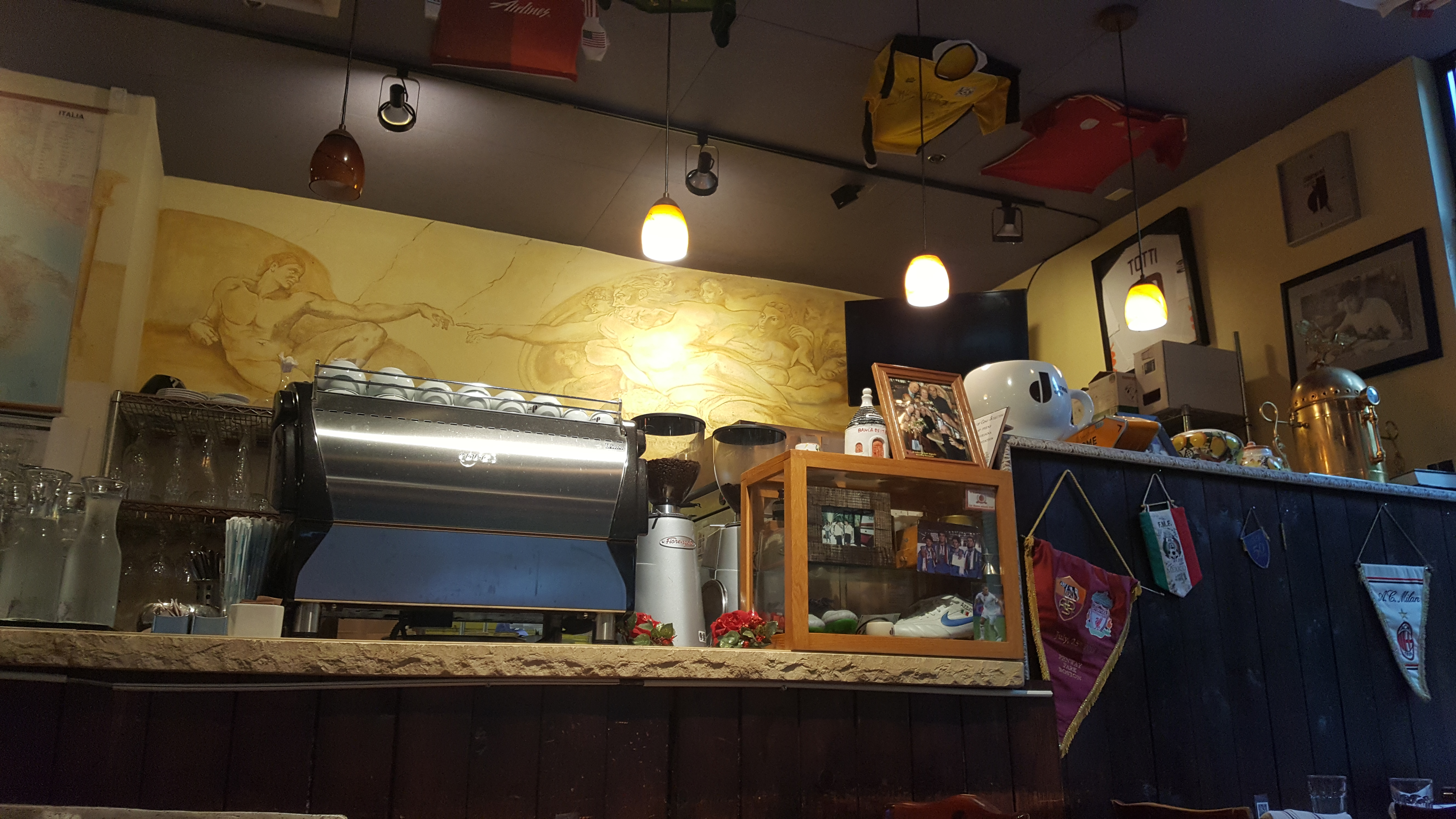
- The restaurant's interior, 2022
- Interactive map of Piazza Italia

Restaurant information
- Food type: Italian
- Location: 1129 Northwest Johnson Street, Portland, Multnomah, Oregon, 97209, United States
- Coordinates: 45.5287°N 122.6830°W
- Website: piazzaportland.com

Piazza Italia is an Italian restaurant in Portland, Oregon's Pearl District, in the United States.

== Description ==
Piazza Italia is an Italian restaurant in northwest Portland's Pearl District. The interior features sports jerseys on the ceiling and televisions. The menu has included wild boar ragu, pappardelle and other pastas, and a large wine selection.

Portland Monthly says, "This perpetually packed Pearl District joint sports imported Italian fountains and a deli counter filled with all manner of cured meats, while mambo and tango music trickling out of speakers. Patrons come primarily for the superb bucatini all’Amatriciana flecked with pancetta and pecorino, the dense gnocchi with braised beef shinbones, and the simple, fragrant bresaola with a wedge of lemon and arugula insalata."

== History ==
The restaurant opened in 1999 or 2000.

== Reception ==
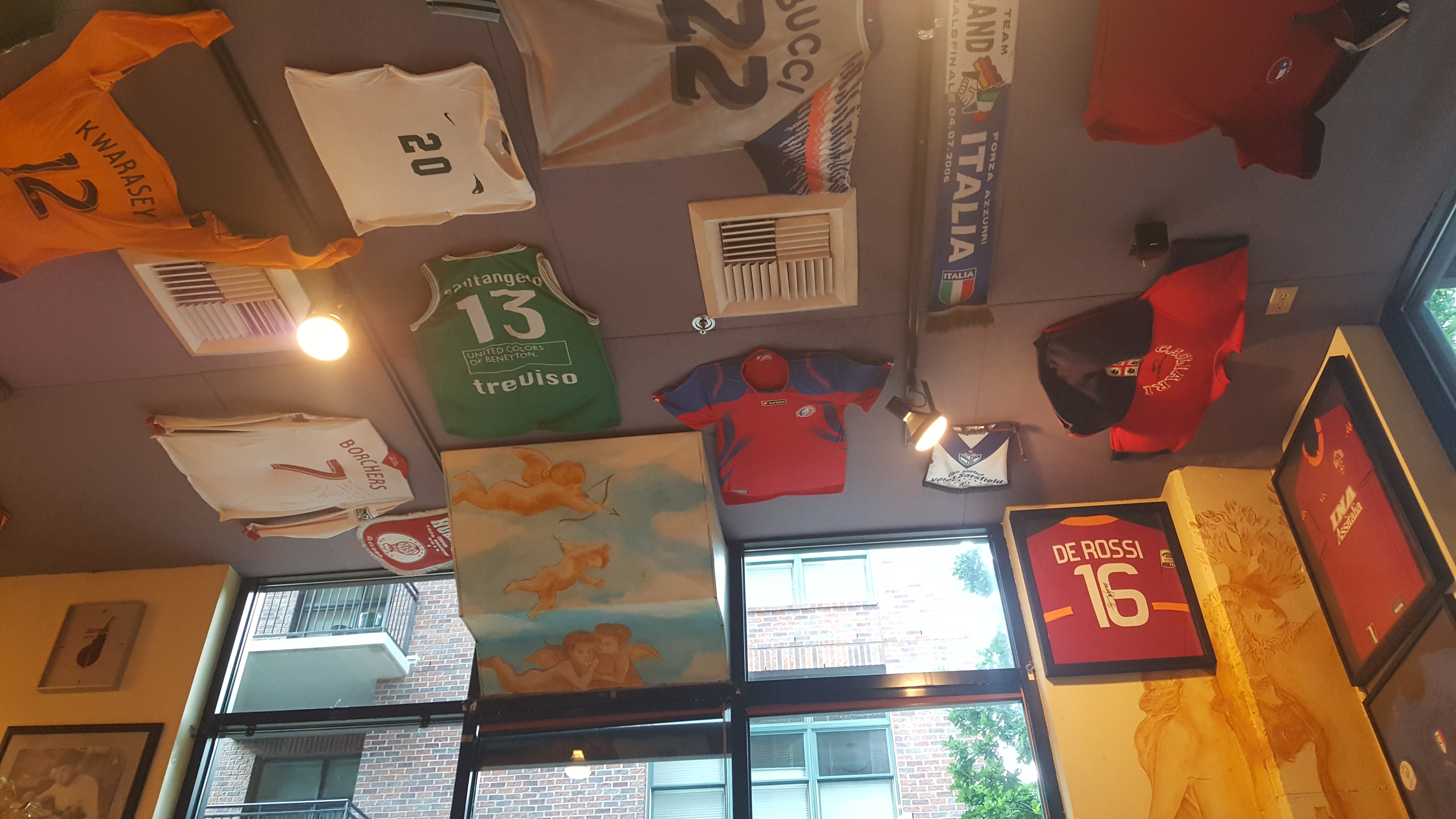
Jerseys on the ceiling

Lonely Planet describes Piazza Italia as "a highly authentic restaurant that succeeds where so many fail: replicating the true essence of Italian food in North America". Janelle Lassalle included the restaurant in Thrillist's 2016 list of "The Best Italian Restaurants in Portland Right Now". Willamette Week's 2016 list of "Our Favorite Italian Spots in Portland" said, "Piazza Italia offers the closest thing to a fast plane trip to somewhere just off the piazza, a casual yet tasty Mediterranean spot with pasta for everyone."

In 2017, Michael Russell of The Oregonian wrote, "Among red-sauce joints, Piazza Italia is about as old-school as they come, offering big portions of simple, satisfying pastas and Italian soccer on TV." He also gave the restaurant "honorable mention" in the newspaper's 2017 list of "Portland's 10 best pasta restaurants, ranked".

Kara Stokes and Maya MacEvoy included the restaurant in Eater Portland's 2022 overview of recommended eateries in the Pearl District. Piazza Italia was also included in the website's 2025 lists of the city's best Italian restaurants and best eateries in the Pearl District.

== See also ==
- List of Italian restaurants
