= Vito's =

Italian restaurant in Seattle, Washington, U.S.

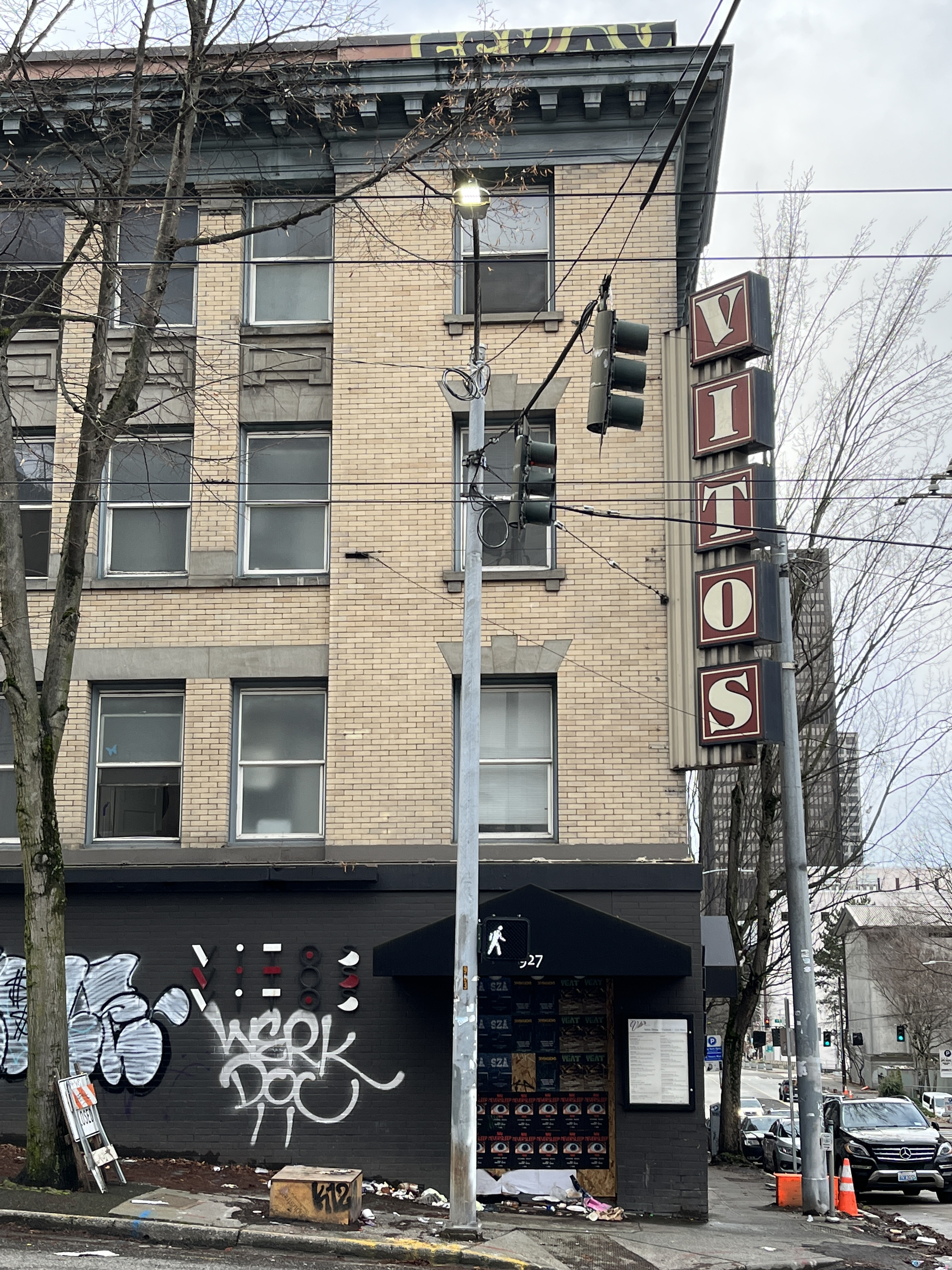
- The restaurant's exterior in December 2022
- Interactive map of Vito's

Restaurant information
- Food type: Italian
- Location: 927 Ninth Avenue, Seattle, Washington, 98104, United States
- Coordinates: 47°36′29.6″N 122°19′38.7″W
- Website: vitosseattle.com

Vito's was an Italian restaurant in Seattle's First Hill neighborhood, in the U.S. state of Washington.

== History ==
Vito's opened in 1953. The restaurant has hosted an annual costume competition for Halloween, along with "sibling" establishment The Hideout. In 2021, Vito's suffered a catastrophic fire that caused it to close temporarily. On January 1, 2024, a second fire occurred in the building while Vito's was still in the process of resolving insurance claim issues. The building is slated for demolition, and Vito's has closed permanently.

== See also ==
- List of defunct restaurants of the United States
- List of Italian restaurants
