= In Bocca al Lupo (restaurant) =

Italian restaurant in Juneau, Alaska, U.S.

- Interactive map of In Bocca al Lupo

Restaurant information
- Food type: Italian
- Location: 120 2nd Street Suite B, Juneau, Alaska, 99801, United States
- Coordinates: 58°18′4″N 134°24′32″W
- Website: inboccaallupoak.com

In Bocca al Lupo is an Italian restaurant in Juneau, Alaska. Established in March 2016, the business was included in The New York Times's 2023 list of the 50 best restaurants in the United States. The menu has included King Crab Pappardelle and Salsiccia Pizza.

== See also ==
- List of Italian restaurants
