= Drago restaurants =

Restaurants owned and operated by the Drago family

The Drago family has owned and operated some of the most famous high-end Italian restaurants in Los Angeles, California, since the 1980s. They are known for their pasta dishes. The family includes four brothers:Tanino, Calogero, Celestino, and Giacomino. Giacomino is co-owner of 11 Los Angeles restaurants—including Beverly Hills' iconic Il Pastaio and Via Alloro, and referred to as the scion of the family's restaurant businesses.

Celestino Drago immigrated to Los Angeles from Sicily in the mid-1970s, and held his first job with Osteria Romana Orsini on Pico Boulevard as a chef before leaving to launch Celestino, "his seminal Italian restaurant in Beverly Hills (now defunct but re-created in Pasadena under the same name)". He brought over three of his brothers from the family restaurant in Messina. Celestino parted ways with investor Art Vella in 1991.

Some of their dishes have been featured in cookbooks.

== Restaurants ==
- Celestino (in Beverly Hills until 1991; now operating in Pasadena)
- L'Arancino (closed)
- Celestino Steak House (West Hollywood, closed 2009)
- Drago Santa Monica (closed)
- Il Pastaio
- Enoteca Drago Beverly Hills wine bar
- Drago Centro (a Stanley Felderman designed restaurant in Downtown Los Angeles, opened 2009)
- Osteria Drago (West Hollywood, opened 2012) (permanently closed)
- Tanino Ristorante Bar
- Panzanella Ristorante Sherman Oaks

== See also ==
- List of Italian restaurants
