= Luce (restaurant) =

Italian restaurant in Portland, Oregon, U.S.

- Interactive map of Luce

Restaurant information
- Food type: Italian
- Location: 2140 East Burnside Street, Portland, Multnonah, Oregon, 97214, United States
- Coordinates: 45°31′22″N 122°38′37″W
- Website: luceportland.com

Luce is an Italian restaurant in Portland, Oregon, United States. It opened in 2011.

== Reception ==
Luce was included in Eater Portland's 2025 list of the city's best Italian restaurants. The business was included in Time Out Portland's 2025 list of the city's eighteen best restaurants.

== See also ==
- List of Italian restaurants
