= Francie (restaurant) =

Italian restaurant in Brooklyn, New York City

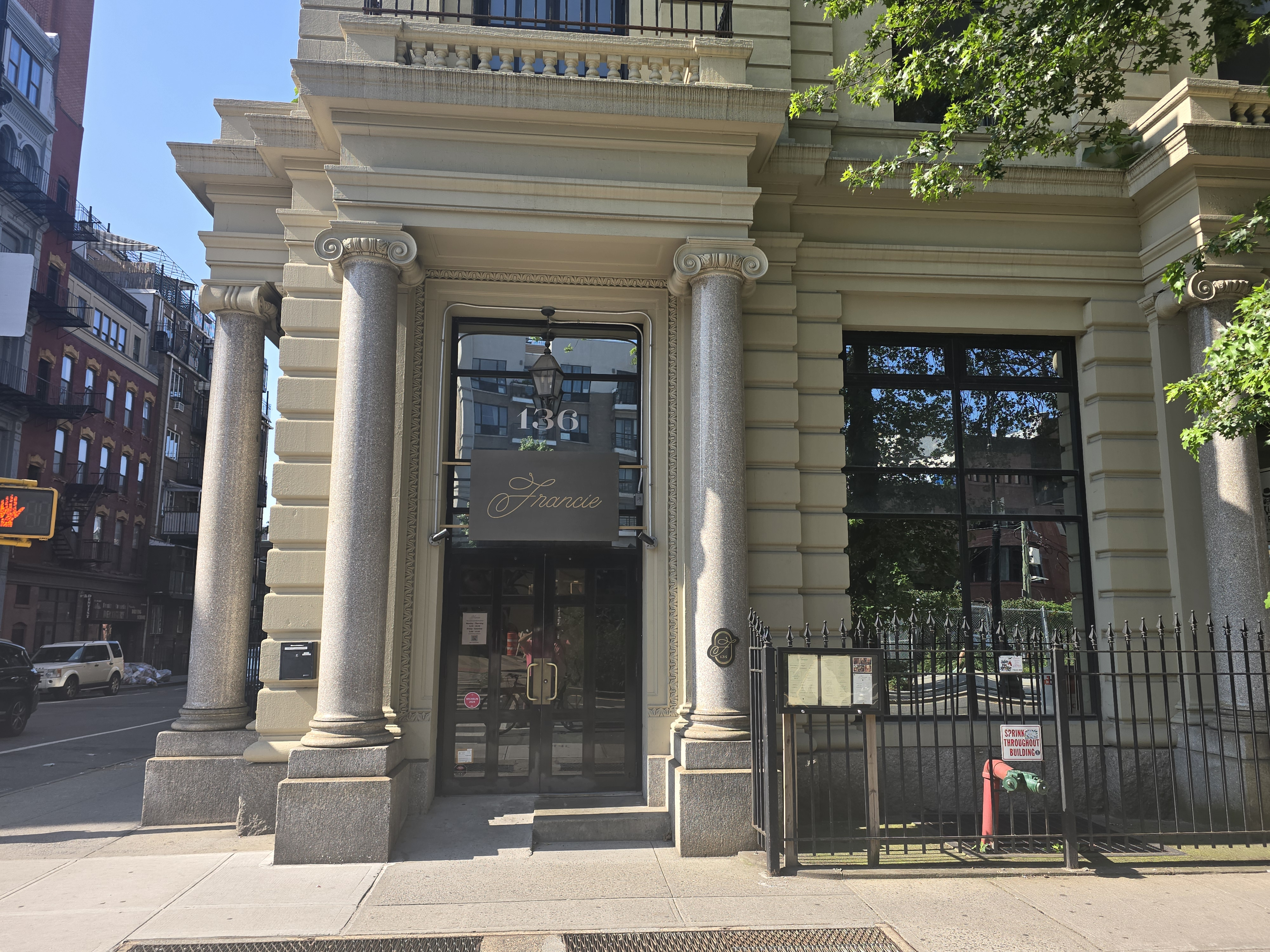
- The entrance to Francie
- Interactive map of Francie

Restaurant information
- Established: December 2020
- Food type: Italian
- Rating: (Michelin Guide)
- Location: 134 Broadway, Brooklyn, New York, 11249
- Coordinates: 40°42′36.7″N 73°57′50.5″W
- Website: www.franciebrooklyn.com

Francie is a French and Italian cuisine inspired Michelin-starred restaurant in Williamsburg, Brooklyn, New York. The signature dish of the house is the 30-day dry aged crown of Rohan duck for two with accompaniments of Swiss chard, parsnip, and soppressata jam.

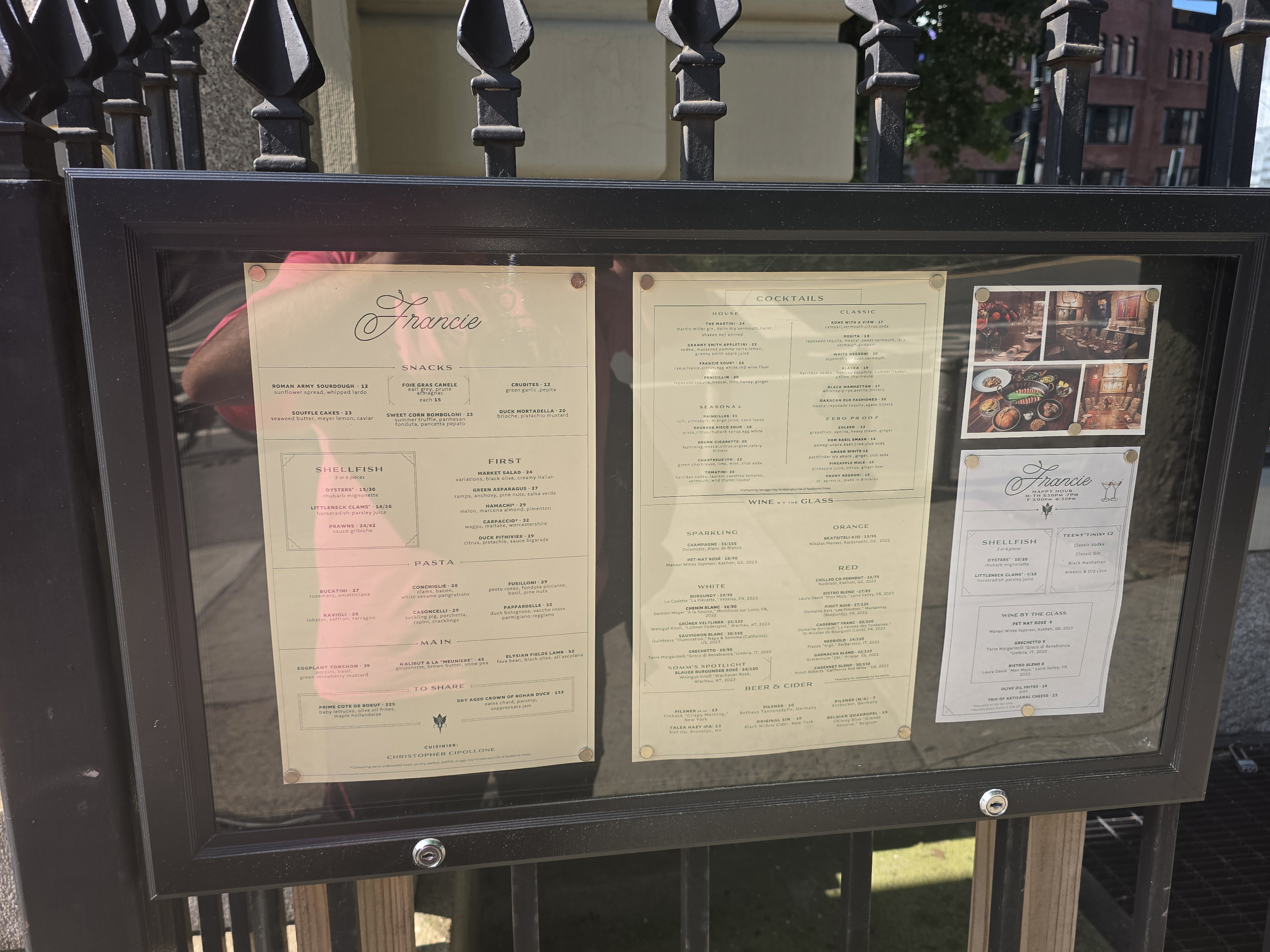
The menu at Francie in July 2025

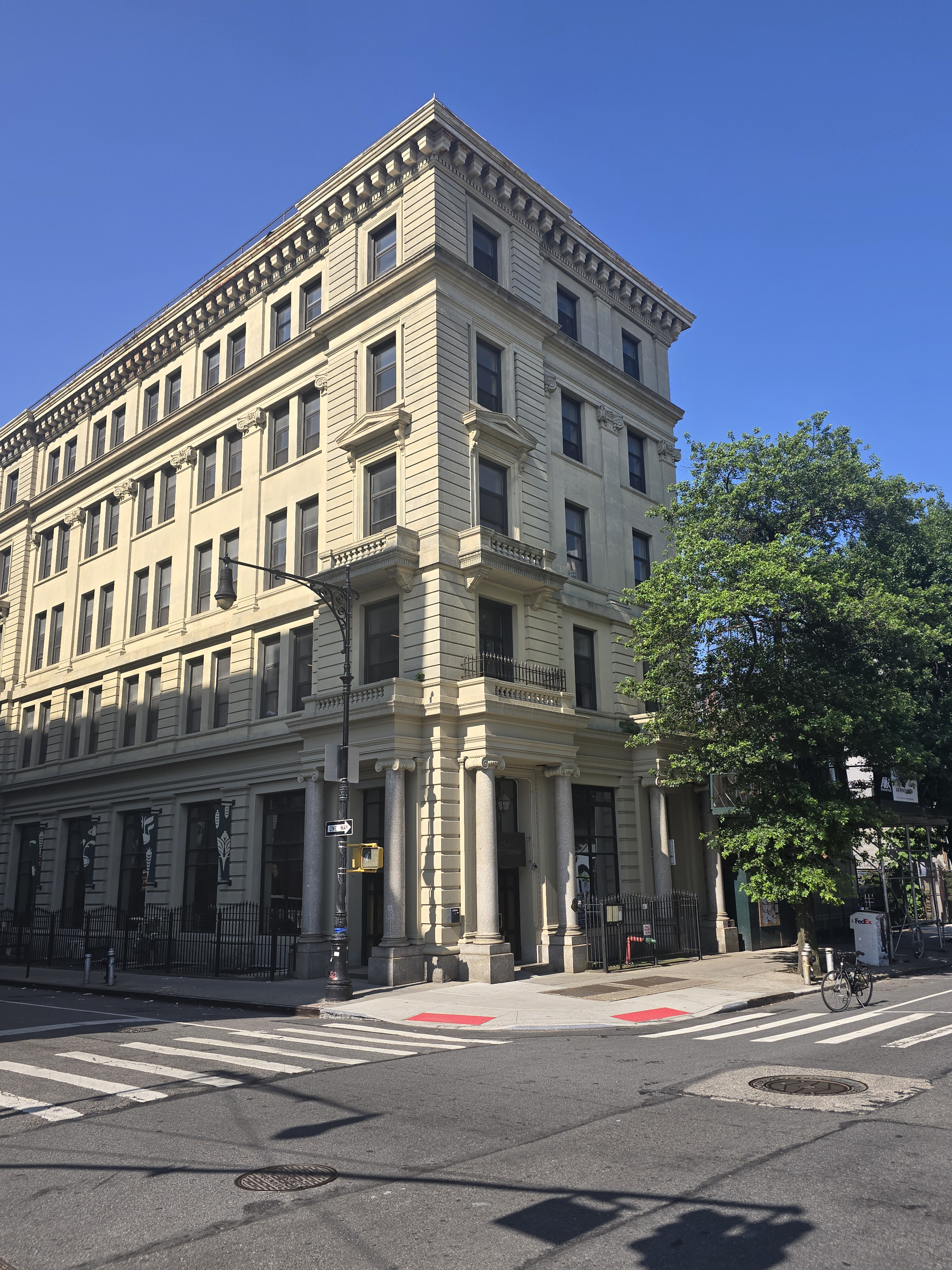
Francie

== See also ==
- List of Italian restaurants
- List of Michelin-starred restaurants in New York City
