= Dolce Vita (restaurant) =

Defunct pizzeria in Houston, Texas, U.S.

- Interactive map of Dolce Vita

Restaurant information
- Established: January 2006
- Closed: May 2020
- Owner: Marco Wiles
- Head chef: Marco Wiles
- Food type: Italian
- Location: Houston, Texas, 77006, United States
- Coordinates: 29.74465°N 95.38744°W
- Website: www.dolcevitahouston.com

Dolce Vita was an Italian restaurant and pizzeria in Houston, in the U.S. state of Texas. The business operated from 2006 to 2020.

== Description ==
Dolce Vita was an Italian restaurant and pizzeria in Houston. Fodor's described the restaurant as "extremely casual, with gracious dining areas scattered throughout a restored older house". Appetizers included marinated mussels with capers, parsley, and potatoes, as well as calamari with mint, orange, and olives. The margarita had tomato, basil, and buffalo mozzarella, and the salsiccia e friarelli had sausage, rapini, and pecorino.

== History ==
Known for Neapolitan pizzas, pastas, and antipasti, the restaurant opened in January 2006 and closed in May 2020, after owner Marco Wiles announced plans to sell the building and property in mid 2019. The restaurant was sold to an investment group and employees were relocated to other restaurants owned by Wiles. Wiles kept the rights to the "Dolca Vita concept".

== Reception ==
Fodor's noted "unexpected appetizers" and said, "For fresh gourmet pizzas and interesting starters, head directly to buzzing Dolce Vita on lower Westheimer's restaurant row." The guide called the margarita "crowd-pleasing" and recommended, "Sit outside in good weather and bad—the patio's covered." The Houston Chronicle described Dolce Vita as a "longtime favorite".

== See also ==
- List of defunct restaurants of the United States
- List of Italian restaurants
