= Antico Nuovo =

Italian restaurant in Los Angeles, California, U.S.

- Interactive map of Antico Nuovo

Restaurant information
- Food type: Italian
- Location: Los Angeles, California, United States
- Coordinates: 34.07665°N 118.31101°W

Antico Nuovo is an Italian restaurant in Koreatown, Los Angeles, in the U.S. state of California. It has been included in The New York Times's list of the 25 best restaurants in Los Angeles.

== See also ==
- List of Italian restaurants
