= Cibo (restaurant) =

Italian restaurant in Portland, Oregon, U.S.

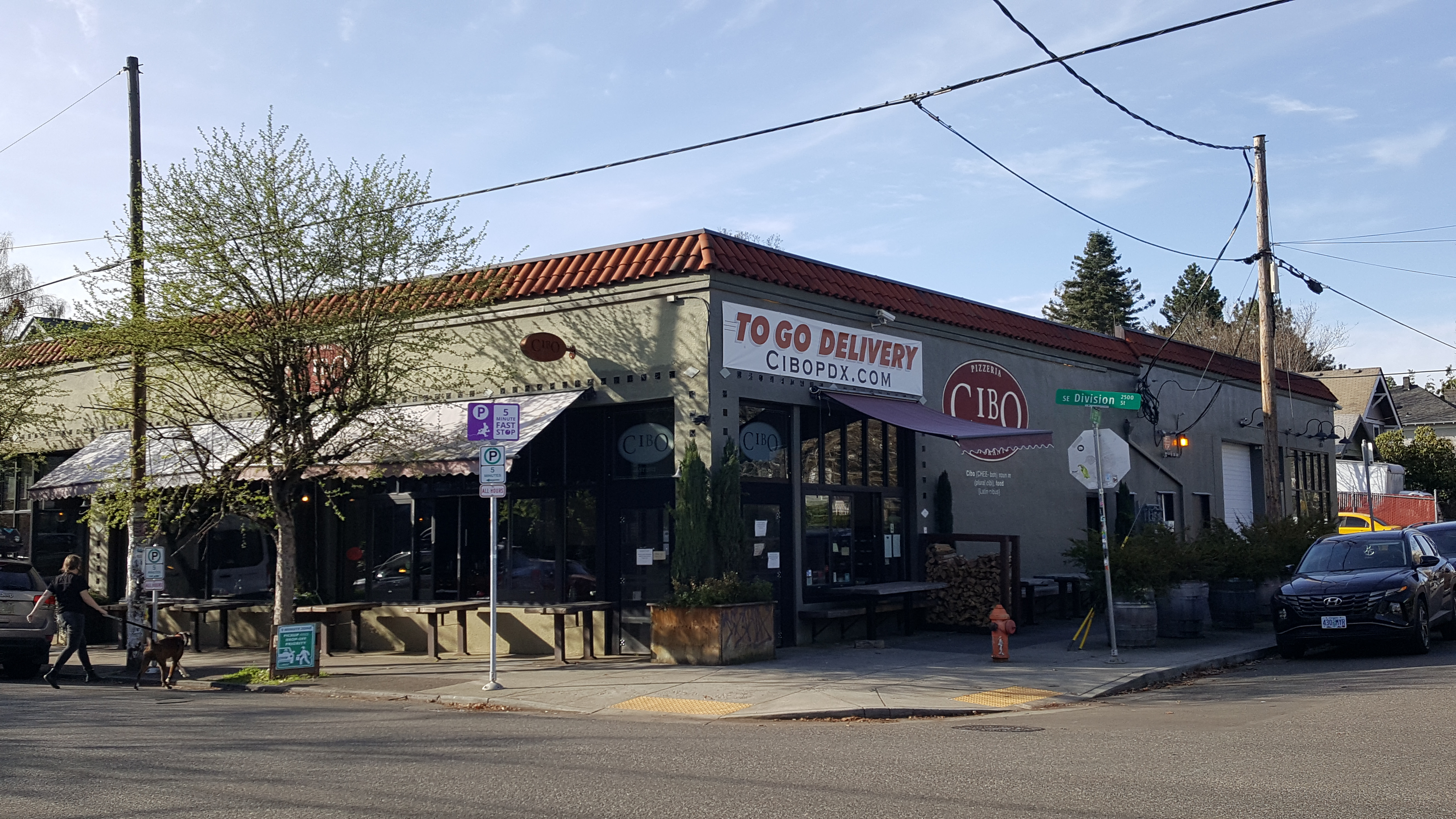
- The restaurant's exterior, 2022
- Interactive map of Cibo

Restaurant information
- Established: July 3, 2012
- Owner: Marco Frattaroli
- Food type: Italian
- Location: 3539 Southeast Division Street, Portland, Oregon, 97202, United States
- Coordinates: 45.5049°N 122.6277°W

Cibo is an Italian restaurant in Portland, Oregon, United States. Owner Marco Frattaroli opened the restaurant in 2012.

== Description ==
Cibo (pronounced chee-bo; Italian for food) is an Italian restaurant in southeast Portland's Richmond neighborhood. The 2,000-square-foot space has a bar, an open kitchen with an imported Ligurian pizza oven, red leather booths, and wrap-around windows.

Erin DeJesus of Eater Portland said the restaurant was "designed around the concept of the cecina, a topped chickpea flatbread, and hand-pulled pizzas". The menu has also included stromboli, charcuterie, baked fish, and Pax romana sausage with foccaccia, relish, and house mustard. Other dishes have included bolognese, polenta lasagne, bacon-wrapped quail, and pan-seared trout with prosciutto and sage.

== History ==
Owner Marco Frattaroli confirmed plans to open Cibo in January 2012. Originally slated to open in April, the restaurant's launch was pushed back to mid May, then June 26, before finally debuting on July 3.

== Reception ==
Samantha Bakall ranked Cibo number 15 in The Oregonian's 2017 list of Portland's twenty-seven best wood-fired pizzas, in which she described the restaurant as a "neighborhood favorite". Zuri Anderson included Cibo in iHeart Media's 2021 overview of the city's "highest-rated" pizza restaurants, based on Tripadvisor reviews.

Alex Frane included Cibo in Eater Portland's 2022 list of fifteen "stellar" Italian eateries in the city, writing: "the mistake could be made that Cibo is more of a pizzeria and bar than full Italian restaurant. But the small-but-solid pasta list and Italian wine menu elevate the restaurant to a more full-fledged Italian eatery, while still being a more casual, weeknight or special occasion kind of venture. Still, the thin, char-kissed wood-fired pizzas are the main draw, especially the signature margherita."

== See also ==
- List of Italian restaurants
