= Daisies (restaurant) =

Italian restaurant in Chicago, Illinois, U.S.

- Interactive map of Daisies

Restaurant information
- Established: June 7, 2017
- Owner: Joe Frillman
- Head chef: Joe Frillman
- Pastry chef: Leigh Omilinsky
- Food type: Italian
- Rating: Bib Gourmand; Green Star
- Location: 2375 North Milwaukee Avenue, Chicago, Illinois, 60647, United States
- Coordinates: 41°55′28.3″N 87°41′58.2″W
- Website: www.daisieschicago.com

Daisies is an Italian restaurant in the Logan Square neighborhood of Chicago, Illinois. Chef-owner Joe Frillman opened it on June 7, 2017. Its menu combines house-made pasta and Italian techniques with produce and other ingredients from the Midwestern United States.

In March 2023, Daisies moved from its original Milwaukee Avenue storefront to a larger location two blocks away, adding a daytime cafe and a dedicated pastry program led by executive pastry chef and partner Leigh Omilinsky. The Michelin Guide lists Daisies as a Bib Gourmand and Green Star restaurant; it received the Green Star in 2023, when it was Chicago's sole recipient. It was also included in The New York Times's 2023 list of 50 notable restaurants in the United States.

== History ==
Before starting Daisies, Frillman cooked at Chicago restaurants including the Bristol, Perennial Virant, and Balena, where chef Chris Pandel was his mentor. Daisies was Frillman's first restaurant as an owner and chef. It opened at 2523 North Milwaukee Avenue, in the former Analogue restaurant space. Frillman named Daisies for his grandmother Helen, whose nickname was Daisy. His brother Tim runs a farm on family land in Prairie View, Illinois, supplying the restaurant with produce.

When indoor dining was suspended during the COVID-19 pandemic in 2020, Frillman began a weekend market at Daisies. It sold produce from his brother's farm alongside goods from other local businesses, and Omilinsky sold pastries there. Her pastries regularly sold out, helping convince Frillman and his investors to develop the market into a full-time operation and seek a larger restaurant space with a cafe. Omilinsky joined Daisies as executive pastry chef and partner in December 2022.

In March 2023, Frillman closed the original dining room and moved Daisies to 2375 North Milwaukee Avenue. The relocation increased its seating capacity from 66 to 110 and its staff from 32 to 76. The larger restaurant added daytime coffee and pastry service, while retaining its pasta-focused dinner menu.

== Cuisine and sustainability ==
Frillman conceived Daisies by treating the Midwest as though it were a region of Italy. House-made pasta forms the basis of the menu, which emphasizes farm vegetables and uses meat mainly as an accent or in a small number of main courses. The expanded location includes a bakery; Omilinsky's pastries combine Italian forms with Midwestern ingredients and references to regional desserts.

Much of the restaurant's produce comes from Frillman's brother's 30-acre farm outside Chicago. Daisies preserves produce through fermentation and returns kitchen scraps to the farm, where some are used for compost and others feed chickens that supply eggs to the restaurant. These sourcing and waste-reduction practices were cited by the Michelin Guide when it awarded the restaurant a Green Star.

== Reception ==
In a 2017 review for Chicago, Jeff Ruby praised the restaurant's atmosphere, service, and vegetable dishes, and wrote that its pastas were "among Chicago's best". He criticized a chicken dish and the limited dessert selection. In 2023, Michelin awarded Daisies a Green Star for sustainable gastronomy while retaining it on the guide's Bib Gourmand list.

The James Beard Awards named Frillman a semifinalist for Best Chef: Great Lakes in both 2024 and 2025. The foundation also named Omilinsky a 2025 semifinalist for Outstanding Pastry Chef or Baker and Daisies a 2026 semifinalist for Outstanding Hospitality.

== See also ==
- List of Italian restaurants
