= Zefiro (restaurant) =

Defunct restaurant in Portland, Oregon, U.S.

- Interactive map of Zefiro

Restaurant information
- Established: 1990
- Closed: 2000
- Food type: Italian; Mediterranean
- Location: 500 Northwest 21st Avenue, Portland, Oregon, 97209, United States
- Coordinates: 45°31′35.5″N 122°41′39.3″W

Zefiro was an Italian and Mediterranean restaurant in Portland, Oregon, United States. The business operated from 1990 to 2000.

== Description ==
The Italian and Mediterranean restaurant Zefiro was located at the intersection of 21st and Glisan in northwest Portland's Northwest District. The interior had sponge-painted yellow walls and a copper-topped bar. The menu included risotto and a Caesar salad. The dessert menu included gelato affogato and sorbet.

== History ==
Bruce Carey and Chris Israel opened the restaurant in 1990. Monique Siu and Sarah Wheaton have also been credited for helping the launch. The business closed in 2000.

== Reception ==
In 1991, Zefiro was The Oregonian's restaurant of the year. In 2007, Eric Asimov of The New York Times said Zefiro "set a standard for Portland cooking". The restaurant has been described as "ground-breaking", a "Portland landmark", and "a key watershed moment in recent restaurant history in Portland".

In 2017, Nick Zukin of Willamette Week said "Bruce Carey changed Portland dining with Zefiro back in the '90s", and The Oregonian's Douglas Perry wrote, "Zefiro led the way to the enthusiastic, limited-frills foodie reputation that Portland now enjoys around the world."

== See also ==
- List of Italian restaurants
