= Campione (restaurant) =

Restaurant in Livingston, Montana, U.S.

- Interactive map of Campione

Restaurant information
- Food type: Italian
- Location: 101 North Main Street, Livingston, Montana, 59047, United States
- Coordinates: 45°39′41.2″N 110°33′37.1″W

Campione is an Italian restaurant in Livingston, Montana. Established in August 2020, the business was included in The New York Times's 2023 list of the 50 best restaurants in the United States.

== See also ==
- List of Italian restaurants
