= Bar Roma =

Italian restaurant in Chicago, Illinois, U.S.

- Interactive map of Bar Roma

Restaurant information
- Food type: Italian
- Location: 5101 North Clark Street, Chicago, Illinois, 60640, United States
- Coordinates: 41°58′28″N 87°40′05″W

Bar Roma is an Italian restaurant in Chicago, Illinois.

== Description ==
Bar Roma is a casual Italian restaurant and bar in Chicago's Andersonville neighborhood. The interior has wood, distressed furniture, and bags of flour on display. The seating capacity is approximately 120 people. The menu includes meatballs, pastas such as cacio e pepe, and pizza.

== History ==
Julia Zhu is the owner / managing partner. Fred Ramos is the chef. The restaurant has hosted meatball eating competitions. The brunch menu for Mother's Day in 2022 included herb frittata and rigatoni carbonara.

== Reception ==
Elanor Bock and Nicole Bruce included Bar Roma in Thrillist's 2022 list of Chicago's sixteen best Italian eateries. The business was included in Time Out magazine's 2023 list of the city's 35 best Italian restaurants, as well as The Infatuation's 2023 guide to "super cute reasonably priced" eateries and 2024 overview of Chicago's best casual Italian restaurants.

== See also ==
- List of Italian restaurants
