= Salumeria Rosi Parmacotto =

Italian restaurant in New York City

Salumeria Rosi
- Interactive map of Salumeria Rosi

Restaurant information
- Established: November 2008; 17 years ago
- Owner: Andrew Loscalzo
- Food type: Italian
- Location: 283 Amsterdam Avenue (near West 73rd Street), New York, NY 10023 on the Upper West Side, in Manhattan, New York, New York, 10023, United States
- Coordinates: 40.772135°N 73.965052°W
- Reservations: https://www.salumeriarosinyc.com/
- Other locations: 283 Amsterdam Avenue (near West 73rd Street), New York, NY 10023
- Other information: New Salumeria Rosi Location is set to open in East Village in early summer of 2025.
- Website: www.salumeriarosinyc.com

Salumeria Rosi is an Italian restaurant located at 283 Amsterdam Avenue (near West 73nd Street), on the Upper West Side in Manhattan, in New York City. It offers imported meats and cheeses, handcrafted pastas, classic Italian wine and cocktails.

Time Out New York gave the restaurant three stars and The New York Times included it to NYT Critic's Pick.

== See also ==
- List of Italian restaurants
