= Rezdôra =

Italian restaurant in New York City

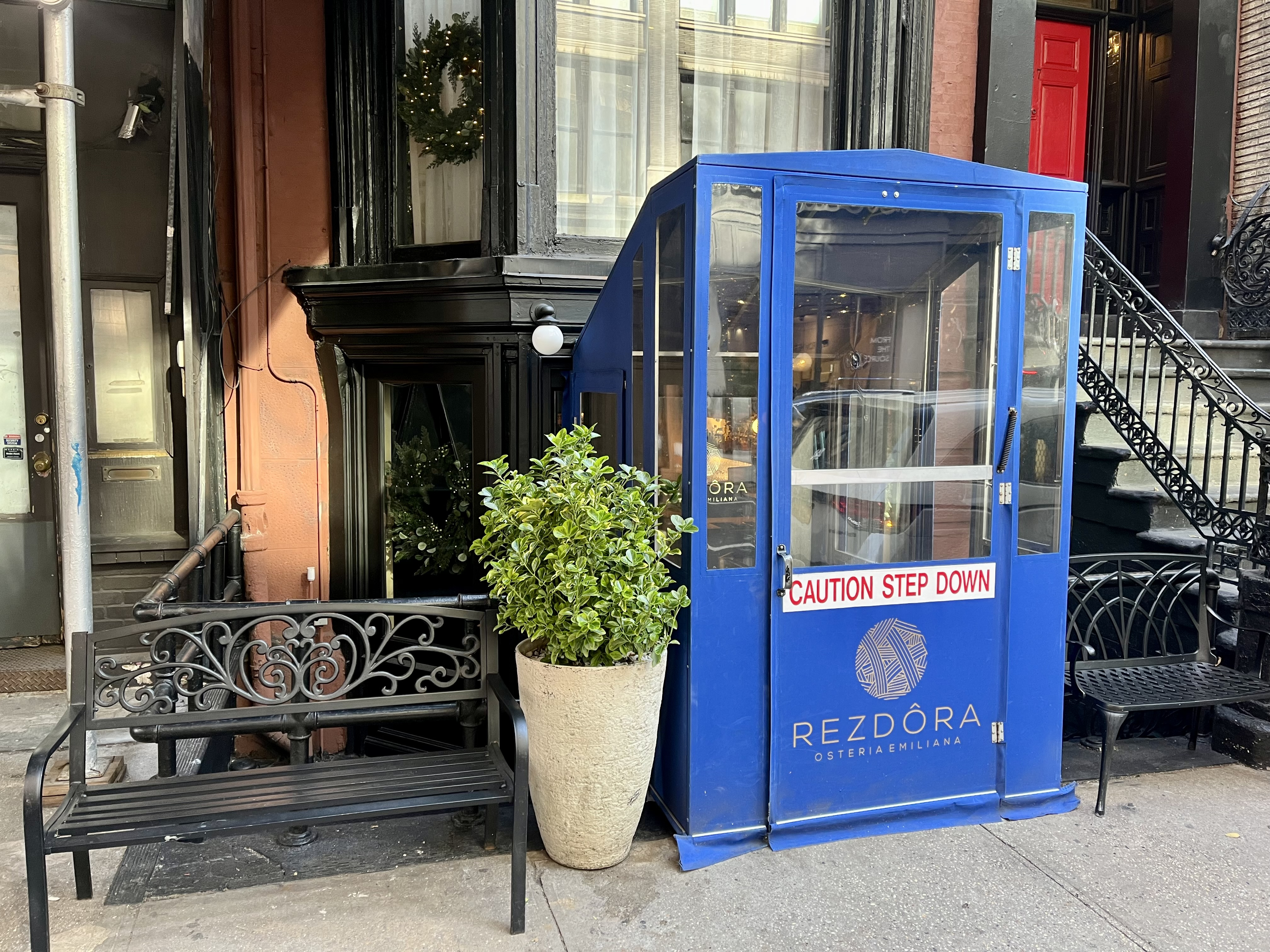
- Rezdôra in November 2023
- Interactive map of Rezdôra

Restaurant information
- Established: May 10, 2019
- Food type: Italian
- Rating: 1 Michelin star
- Location: 27 East 20th Street, New York City, New York, 10003, United States
- Coordinates: 40°44′20.6″N 73°59′20.7″W
- Website: www.rezdora.nyc

Rezdôra is an Italian restaurant in the Flatiron District of Manhattan in New York City. The restaurant has received a Michelin star.

== See also ==
- List of Italian restaurants
- List of Michelin-starred restaurants in New York City
