= Spoleto (restaurant) =

Brazilian restaurant chain

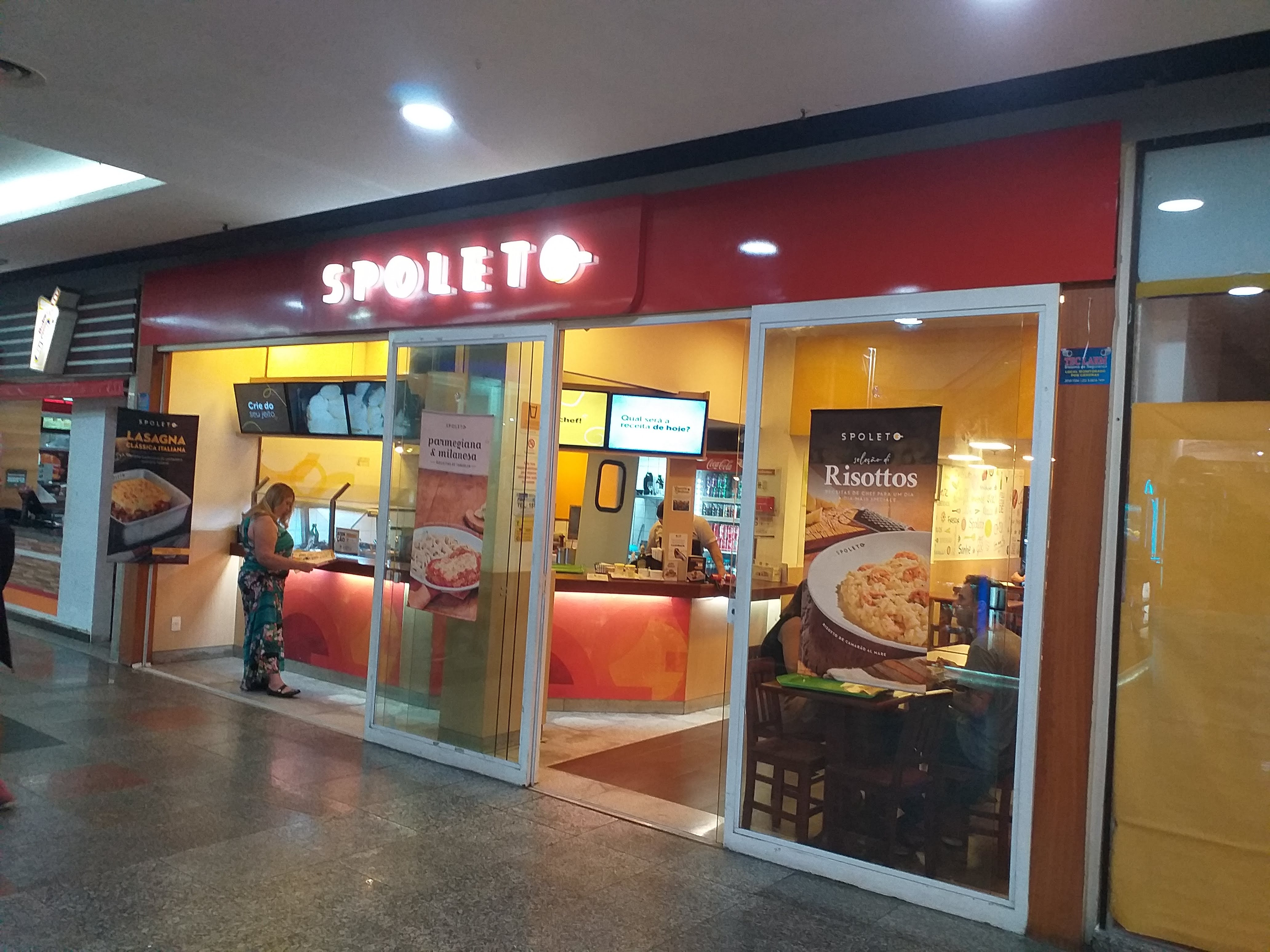
- A Spoleto in Nova Friburgo
- Industry: Restaurants
- Genre: Fast food
- Founded: Rio de Janeiro, Brazil 1999; 27 years ago
- Founder: Eduardo Ourivio and Mário Chady
- Headquarters: Rio de Janeiro, Brazil
- Number of locations: 250+ in Brazil, 8 in Mexico, 3 in Spain and 6 in the US
- Products: Pasta; Salads; Desserts
- Owner: Grupo Trigo
- Website: http://www.spoleto.com.br

Spoleto (Portuguese pronunciation: [spoˈletu]) is a Brazilian restaurant chain that develops the concept of fast food to Italian cuisine. The restaurant's name is a tribute to the town of Spoleto, Italy.

The company was established in 1999 in Rio de Janeiro by Eduardo Ourivio and Mário Chady. In 2001, the company adopted the franchise system.

Currently, the chain has over 200 restaurants located throughout Brazil, eight in Mexico, three in Spain and six in the United States.

== History ==
Spoleto's history begins in 1992 with the partnership of friends Eduardo and Mario Chady Ourívio for the opening of Guilhermina Café in Leblon.
