= Lucy's Cafe =

Italian restaurant in Pennsylvania

Coordinates: 40.2834°N 76.6567°W

Lucy's Cafe was an Italian restaurant located in Hershey, Pennsylvania that was family-owned and operated for more than 75 years. The restaurant's meatballs were from a homemade recipe and were popular throughout the state; they were at one time sold at Hershey Bears hockey games.

== History ==
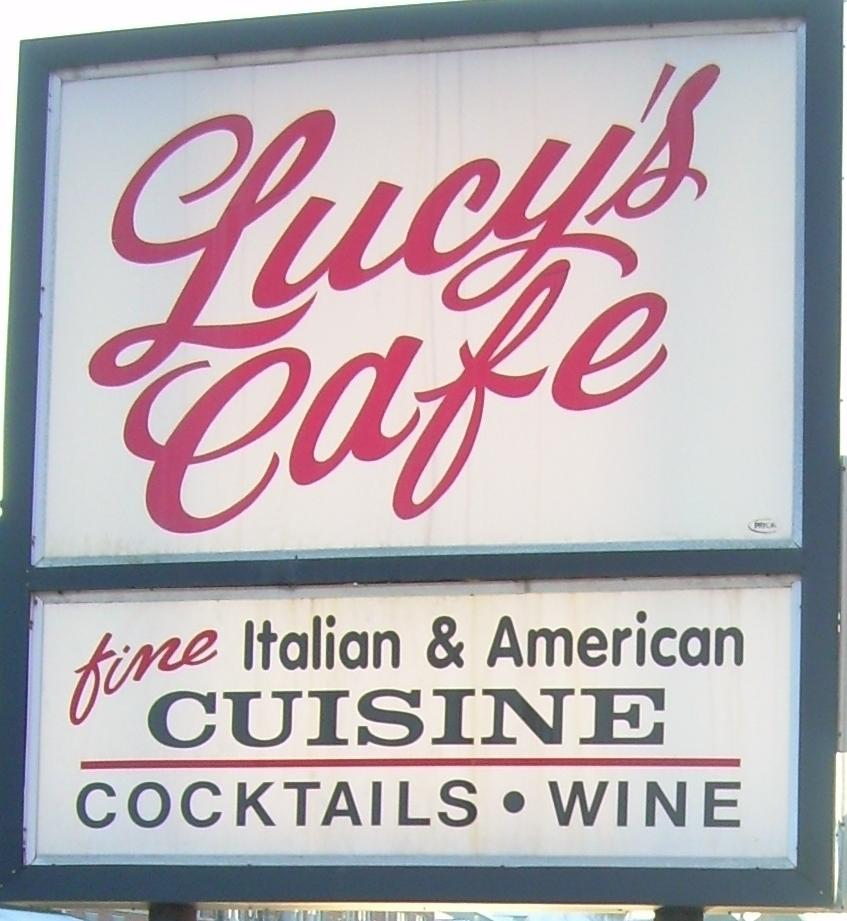
The former sign of Lucy's Cafe

Lucy's Cafe was founded by sisters Josephine Fromboluti and Lucia Santoro after their immigration from Italy. Mary Tatangelo, daughter of Fromboluti, ran the restaurant for the bulk of its history. She shared ownership with sons Tony and Robert Tatangelo in the 1970s and '80s. While Mary continued to remain active in the family business she built, Tony was the sole proprietor of Lucy's Cafe from 1989 until its closing in 2007.

Celebrities such as Joe Paterno, Michael Bolton, Jim Kelly, Lynn Swann, and many more frequented Lucy's Cafe throughout the years. The restaurant also was visited annually by players and coaches of the Big 33 Football Classic.

=== Purchase by Hershey Entertainment and Resorts Company ===
In October 2007, local newspapers confirmed rumored reports that Lucy's Cafe had been sold. The purchase was made by Hershey Entertainment and Resorts Company (also known as HERCO). Coincidentally, Lucy's Cafe had formerly sold meatballs to the GIANT Center, home arena of the Hershey Bears (an AHL team owned by HERCO), for sale at the team's games. The restaurant's final day of business was December 31, 2007.

On January 21, 2008, a fire damaged much of the building that was once Lucy's Cafe. The cause of the fire was suspected to be an oil tank that may have caught fire.

== Lucy's Cafe Meat Sauce and Meatballs ==
Lucy's Cafe was known regionally for its meat sauce and hand-rolled meatballs, which were sold both in the restaurant with meals and "to go" in container sizes ranging from quart to gallon.

The meatballs were so well known that for several years they were sold at Hershey Bears' (an American Hockey League team) home games.

The recipe for the sauce and meatballs remains a family secret. During the restaurant's final month of business, sales of the famed meat sauce and meatballs boomed. Currently, the recipe has not been published. On April 9, 2008, the sale of Lucy's Cafe meat sauce and meatballs resumed. They can be purchased from Bricker's Pizza and Restaurant, Hershey, Pennsylvania.
