= Veeno =

Italian wine bar restaurant chain in the United Kingdom

- Company type: Private
- Industry: Hospitality, Restaurant, Bar
- Founded: 2013; 13 years ago
- Founders: Nino Caruso
- Headquarters: UK
- Number of locations: 5
- Area served: United Kingdom
- Key people: Nino Caruso (Founder), Rodrigue Trouillet (Owner / Director)
- Products: Italian wine, Italian cuisine
- Revenue: £3m
- Number of employees: 50
- Website: www.veenobars.com

Veeno, is an Italian wine bar restaurant chain in the United Kingdom. The company was founded in 2013 by Nino Caruso and the first outlet was opened in Manchester in November 2013. As of June 2025, the company has 5 outlets: Leeds, Bristol, Chester, Edinburgh, Leicester.

In early 2018, after the exit of one of the founders, Rodrigue Trouillet, ex Disney executive, joined the company as co-owner.

== Franchising ==
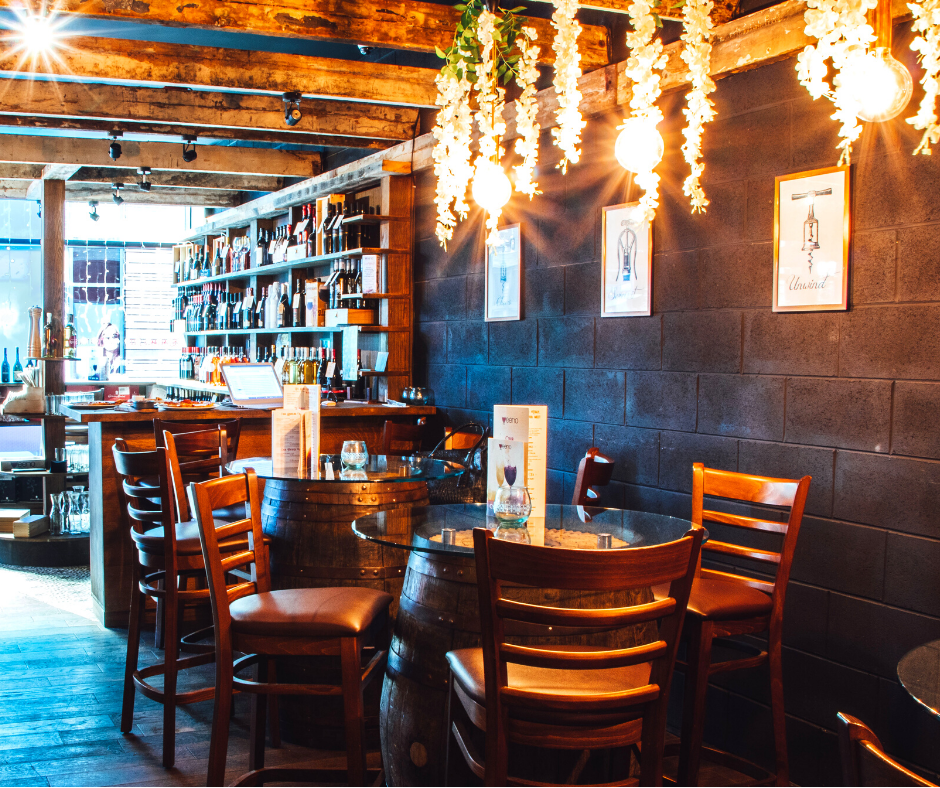
Veeno Bar

Veeno is opening in Durham in September 2025 and is looking to expand across the U.K. and internationally.

== Veeno Bars ==
As of June 2025, the company has 5 outlets: Leeds, Bristol, Chester, Edinburgh, Leicester.
