= Lusardi's =

Italian restaurant in New York City

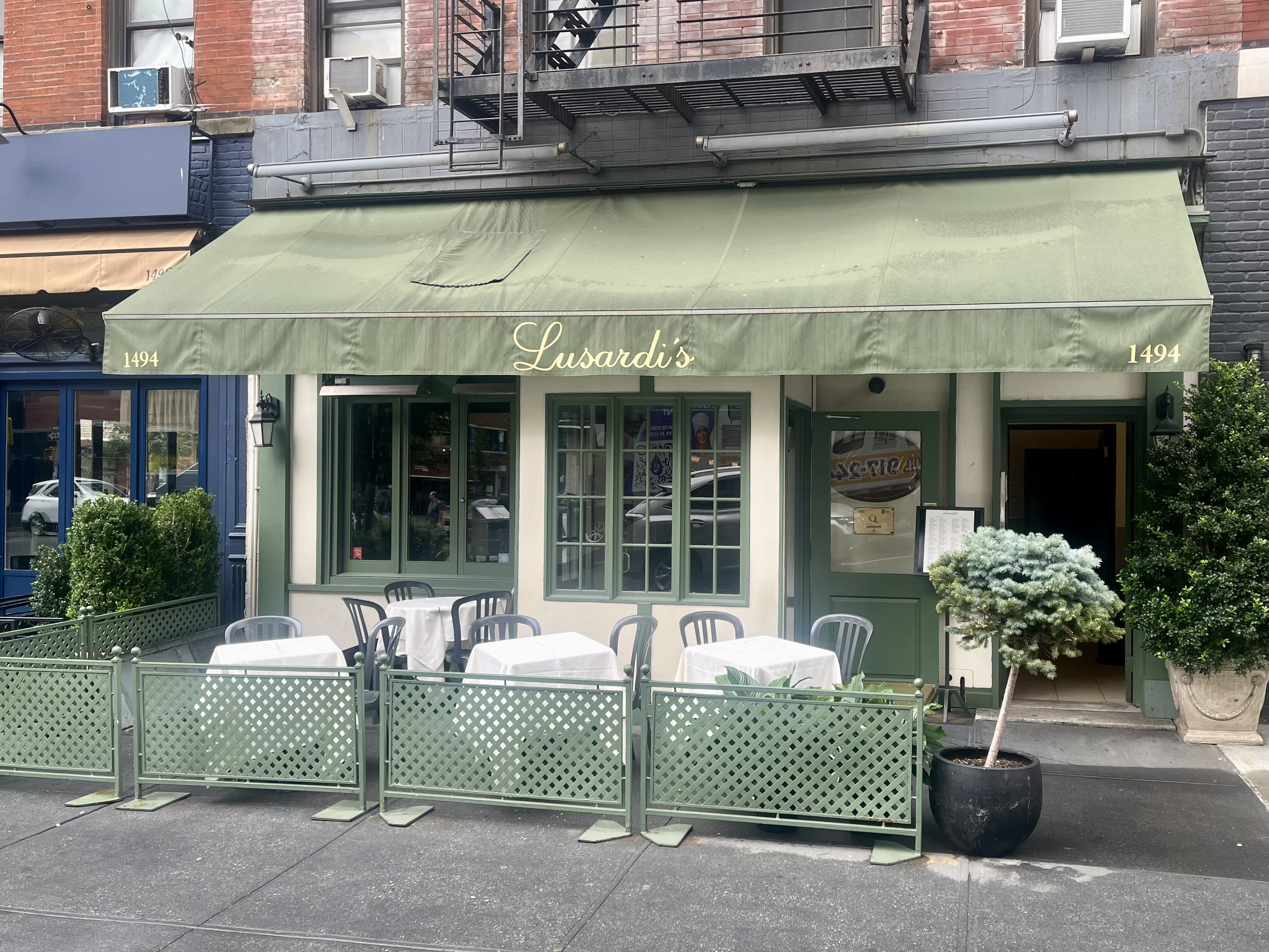
- The restaurant's exterior in 2025
- Interactive map of Lusardi's

Restaurant information
- Established: 1982; 44 years ago
- Owners: Luigi and Mauro Lusardi
- Chef: Claudio Meneghini
- Food type: Northern Italian
- Location: 1494 Second Avenue at 78th Street, Manhattan, New York City, New York, New York, 10075, United States
- Coordinates: 40.772459°N 73.95548°W
- Seating capacity: 75
- Website: www.lusardis.com

Lusardi's is a Northern Italian restaurant located at 1494 Second Avenue (between East 77th and East 78th Streets) on the Upper East Side of Manhattan, in New York City.

The restaurant opened in 1982. It is owned and run by two brothers, Luigi and Mauro Lusardi. The restaurant has an old-world vibe. The dining room has a capacity of 75 guests. The menu consists of Northern Italian Tuscan dishes. The wine list has over 400 vintage wines. The chef is Claudio Meneghini.

When Leon Hess owned the New York Jets, he would eat dinner after almost every home game at Lusardi's.

== Reviews ==
In 2012, Zagat's gave it a 24 rating for food.
