= Masa of Echo Park =

Restaurant and pizzeria in Los Angeles, California, U.S.

- Interactive map of Masa of Echo Park

Restaurant information
- Established: 2004
- Owners: Rob Rowe and Rhonda Reynolds
- Food type: Chicago-style pizza, Italian cuisine
- Location: 1800 W. Sunset Boulevard, Los Angeles, California, 90026, United States
- Coordinates: 34.0776°N 118.2597°W
- Website: masaofechopark.com

Masa of Echo Park is an Italian restaurant, bakery, and pizzeria in Los Angeles, California. It is located on Sunset Boulevard in the city's Echo Park neighborhood. Founded by Chicago natives Rob Rowe and Rhonda Reynolds in 2004, Masa of Echo Park has been rated one of the best restaurants in the United States for Chicago-style pizza, according to Yelp.

Masa of Echo Park continues to be owned by husband and wife team Rowe and Reynolds, with the latter honored by U.S. Representative Adam Schiff in 2023 as Woman of the Year for California's 30th congressional district for her work with Masa and in the broader community. The restaurant also has a reputation for strong vegan options.
