= Spaghettim =

Israeli restaurant

Restaurant information
- Food type: Italian
- Location: Israel
- Seating capacity: 140
- Website: spaghettimpt.co.il

Spaghettim (Hebrew for spaghettis, Hebrew spelling: ספגטים) was an Israeli restaurant chain of 17 restaurants that ended as one Italian cuisine restaurant in Petah Tikva. The restaurant was located at HaSivim Street 18 in Kiryat Matalon. The food served was non-kosher. It seated 140 customers.

== History ==
Founded in the 1990s, Spaghettim grew to 17 branches, of which 13 franchises. In 2010 it nearly collapsed under its debt.

In March 2018 the chain had 2 restaurants, in Petah Tikva and Ramat Hasharon. By November 2018 only the branch in Petah Tikva survived. Nevertheless, the Spaghettim website continued to offer franchise options. Eventually, the chain website was replaced by a local website. On 1 January 2024, the restaurant closed for renovations, yet continued to make food for delivery. Subsequently the restaurant closed altogether and its URL was reused for a magazine under the name Spaghettim.
