= Solo Per Due =

Small restaurant near Vacone, Italy

Solo Per Due is an Italian restaurant that claims to be the smallest restaurant in the world. It was founded in 1989 by Remo Di Claudio on the former estate of the poet Horace, near Vacone, Italy. As suggested by its name, Just for Two in English, the restaurant seats two people at a single table in a room measuring 400 square feet (37 m^{2}) in area.

== Description ==
Solo Per Due is owned by Remo di Claudio. They founded the restaurant in 1989 as an alternative to the problems presented by waiting times at larger restaurants. The restaurant is housed in a 19th-century building near Vacone, Italy, near the former estate of the Roman poet Horace.

Solo Per Due claims to be the smallest restaurant in the world. The restaurant's dining room is only 400 square feet (37 m^{2}) in area and is decorated with busts of Roman emperors, flowers and candelabras. It only seats two people at a single table: in fact, the restaurant's name translates to "just for two" from Italian. The restaurant serves two meals a day: lunch and dinner.

Bookings at Solo Per Due have to be made and confirmed more than 10 days in advance. There are no last-minute cancellations. Due to its capacity, Solo Per Due is usually booked months in the future.

== Menu ==
The menu for a meal at Solo Per Due is created for every guest based on their preferences. Each menu starts at a fixed price of €1000 (not payable with credit card). A meal at Solo Per Due can last for more than three hours.

The restaurant has a wine list not included in the price. In any case, diners are invited to choose from a selection of 10 wines included in the price shown to them by a waiter.
