= Toaster =

Domestic appliance used for toasting foods, especially bread

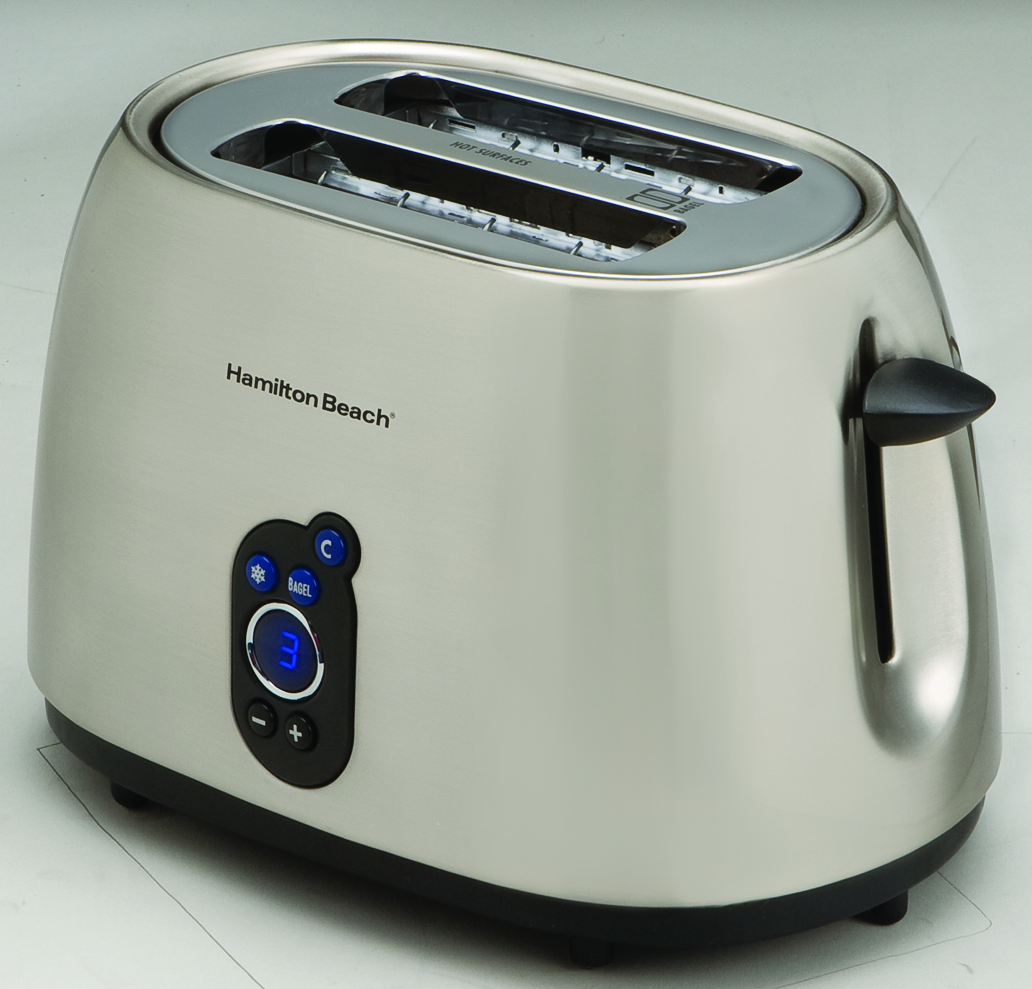
- A toaster from 2008
- Inventor: Crompton & Company of Chelmsford, Essex
- Inception: 1893; 133 years ago
- Manufacturer: Various
- Available: Globally

A toaster is a small electric appliance that uses radiant heat to cook sliced bread into toast. When cooked the bread browns due to the maillard reaction. It typically consists of one or more slots into which bread is inserted, lowered, and cooked using heating elements, often made of nichrome wire, to generate heat and toast the bread.

== Types ==
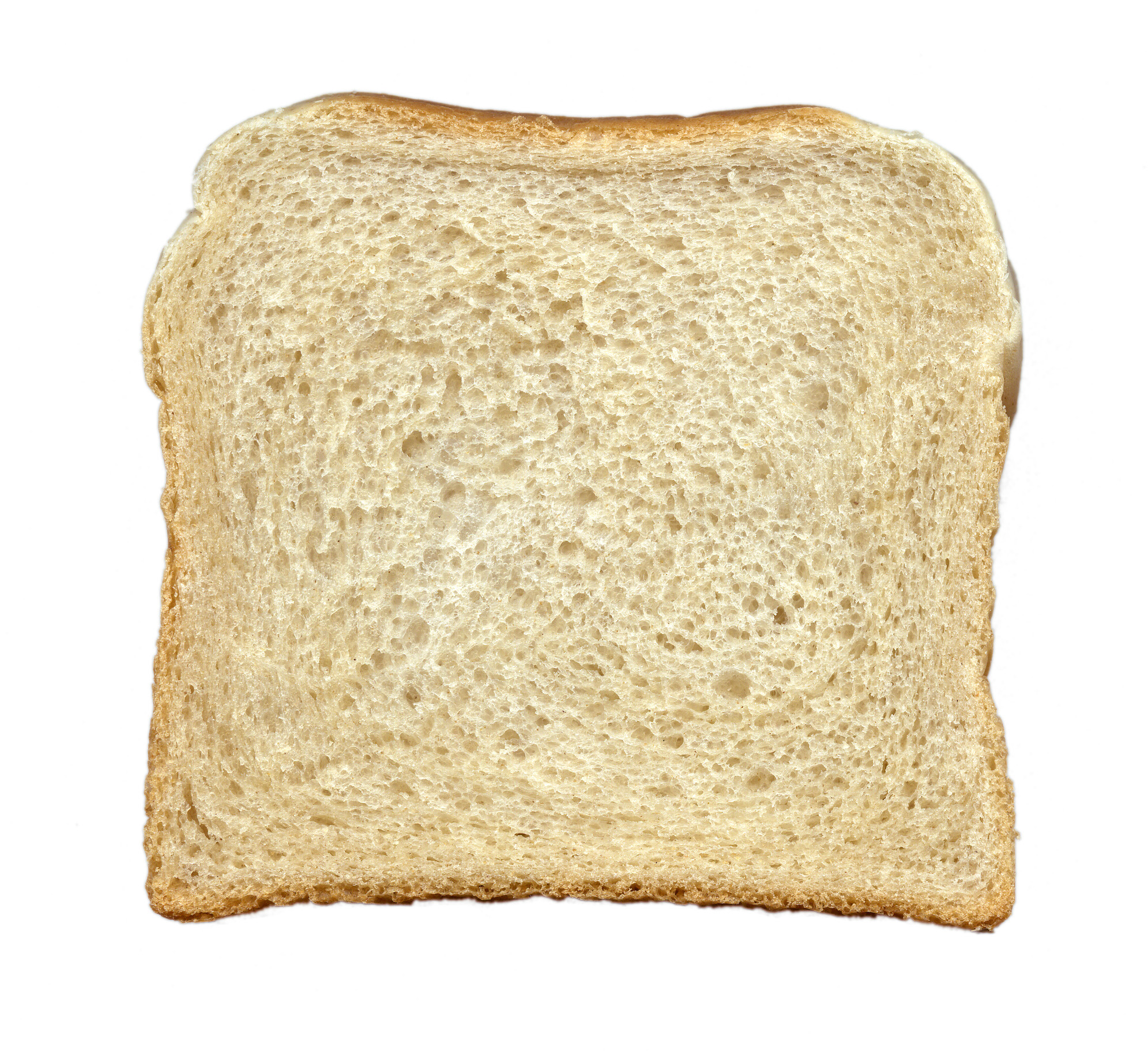
Untoasted slice of white bread

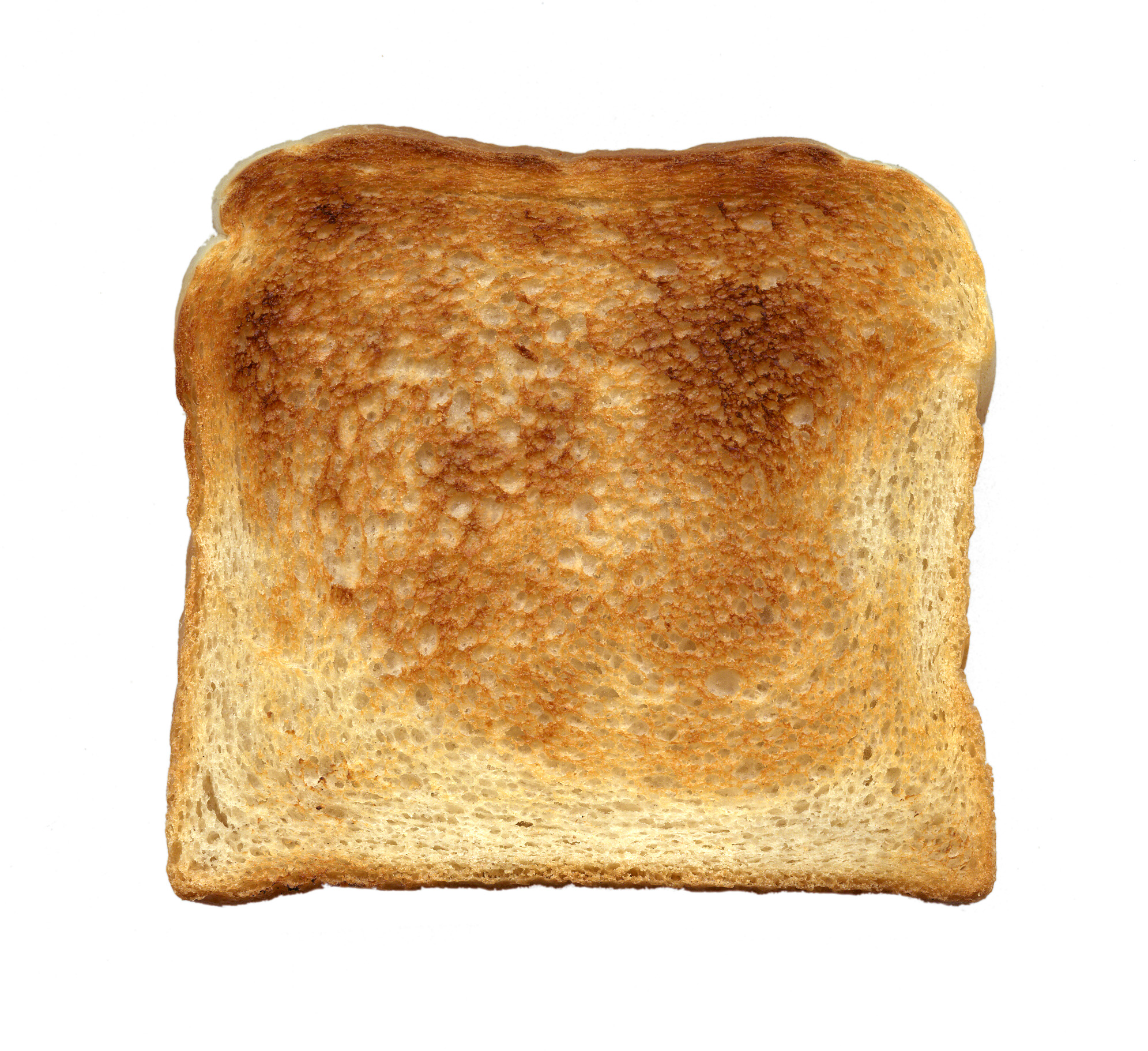
The same slice of bread, now toasted

=== Pop-up toaster ===
In a pop-up or automatic toaster, a single vertical piece of bread is dropped into a slot on the top of the toaster. A lever on the side of the toaster is pressed down, lowering the bread into the toaster and activating the heating elements. The length of the toasting cycle (and therefore the degree of toasting) is adjustable via a lever, knob, or series of pushbuttons, and when an internal device determines that the toasting cycle is complete, the toaster turns off and the toast pops up out of the slots.

The completion of toasting may be determined by a timer (sometimes manually set) or by a thermal sensor, such as a bimetallic strip, located close to the toast.

Toasters may also be used to toast other foods such as teacakes, toaster pastries, potato waffles and crumpets, though the resultant accumulation of fat and sugar inside the toaster can contribute to its eventual failure.

Among pop-up toasters, those toasting two slices of bread are more purchased than those that can toast four. Pop-up toasters can have a range of appearances beyond just a square box and may have an exterior finish of chrome, copper, brushed metal, or any colored plastic. The marketing and price of toasters may not be an indication of quality for producing good toast. A typical modern two-slice pop-up toaster can draw from 600 to 1200 watts.

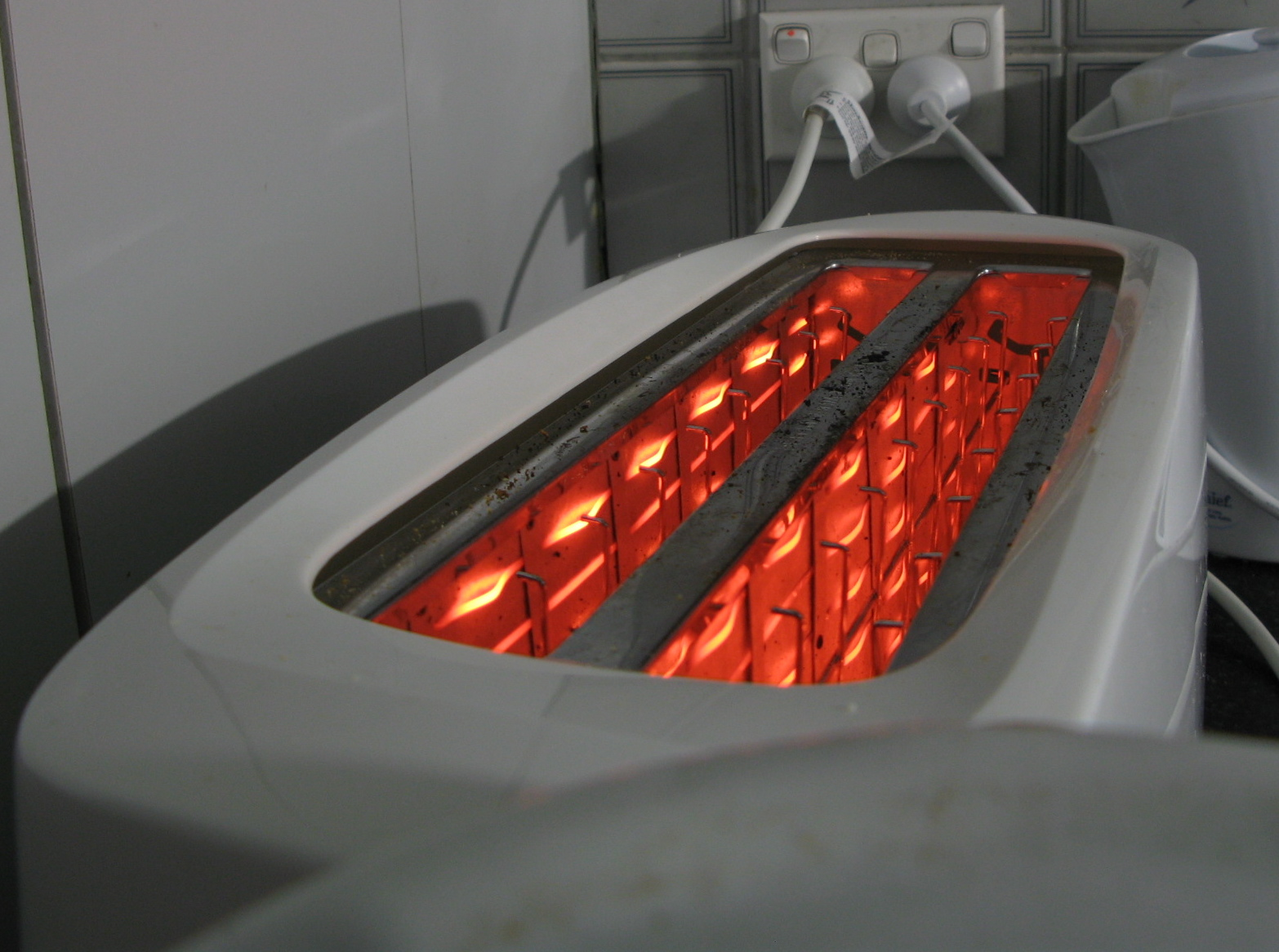
Glowing filaments of a modern two-slice toaster

Beyond the basic toasting function, some pop-up toasters offer additional features such as:

- One-sided toasting, which some people prefer when toasting bagels
- The ability to power the heat elements in only one of the toaster's several slots
- Slots of various depths, lengths, and widths to accommodate a variety of bread types
- Provisions to allow the bread to be lifted higher than the normal raised position, so toast that has shifted during the toasting process can safely and easily be removed

=== Toaster oven ===
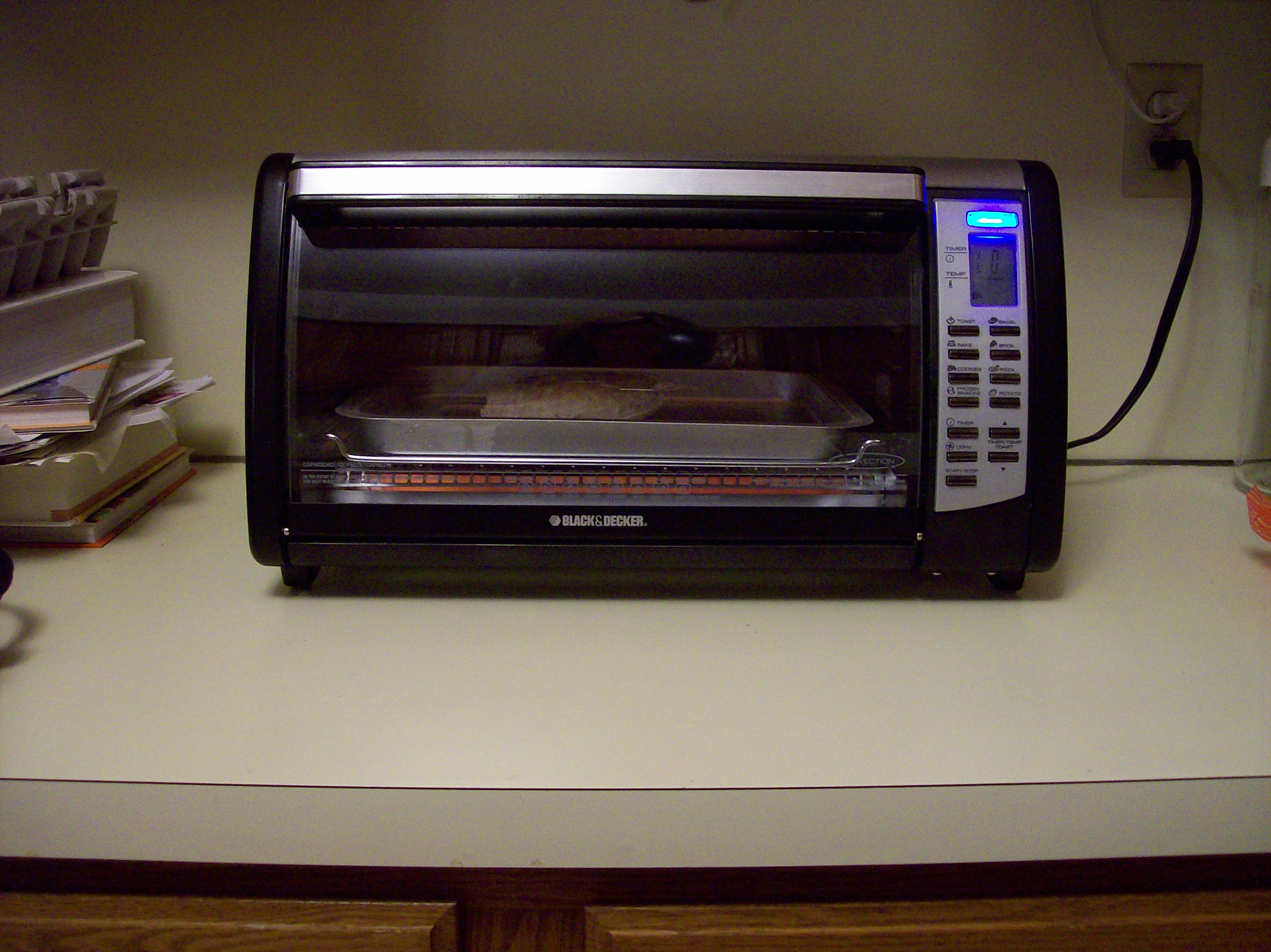
A toaster oven

Invented in 1910, toaster ovens are small electric ovens that provide toasting capability plus a limited amount of baking and broiling capability. Similarly to a conventional oven, toast or other items are placed on a small wire rack, but toaster ovens can heat foods faster than regular ovens due to their small volume. They are especially useful when the users do not also have a kitchen stove with an integral oven, such as in smaller apartments and recreational vehicles such as truck campers.

=== Conveyor toaster ===
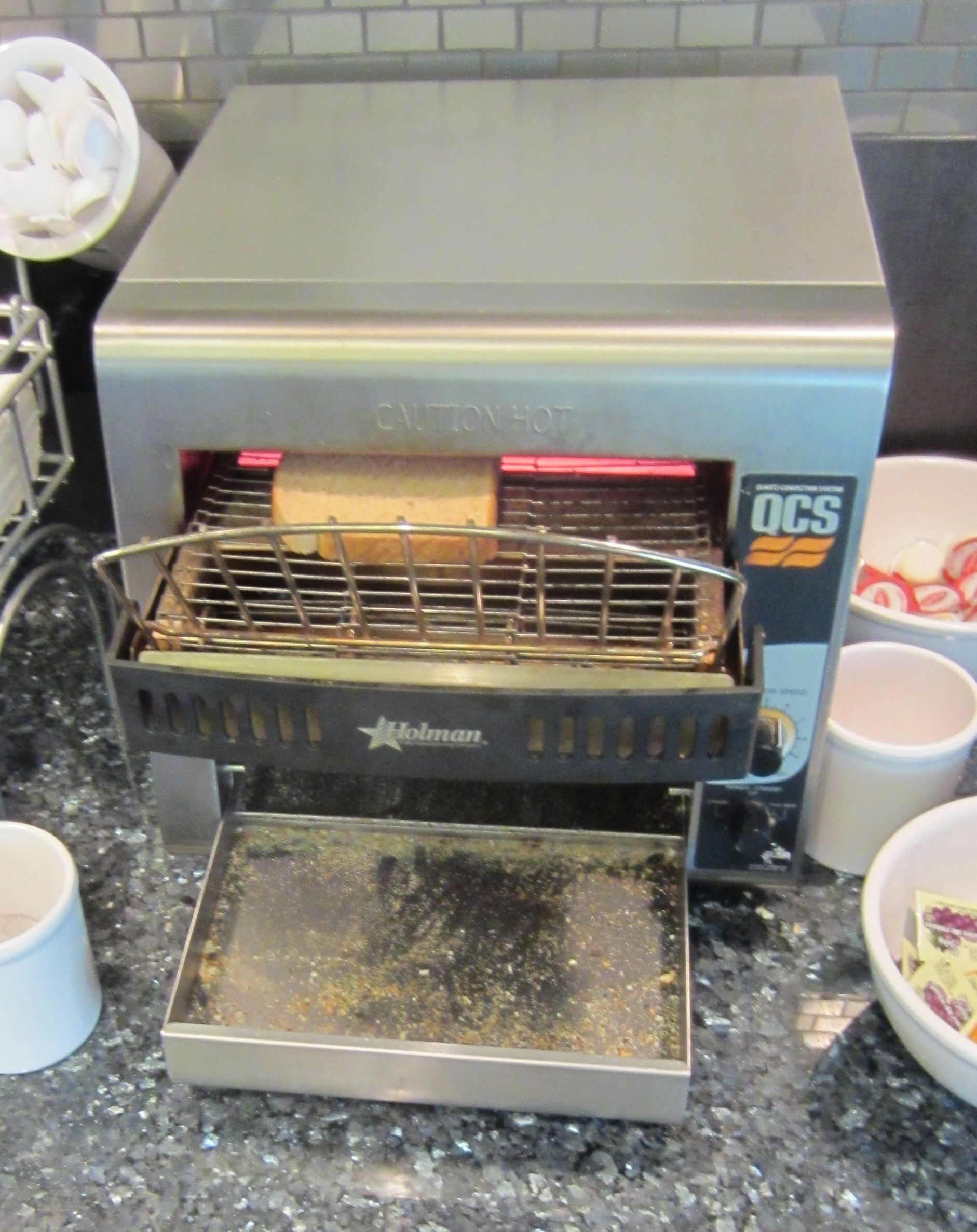
A conveyor toaster

A conveyor toaster is an appliance that caramelizes and carries bread products on a belt or chain into and through a heated chamber. Conveyor toasters are designed to make many slices of toast and are generally used in the catering industry, restaurants, cafeterias, institutional cooking facilities, and other commercial food service situations where constant or high-volume toasting is required. Bread can be toasted at a rate of 250–1800+ slices an hour. The total radiant heat a conveyor toaster applies to each slice can be controlled by adjusting the conveyor speed or the output strength of the heating elements. Conveyor toasters are generally available with either a vertical or horizontal conveyor orientation. Conveyor toasters have been produced for home use; in 1938, for example, the Toast-O-Lator went into limited production.

== History ==
=== Non-electric toasters ===
Before the development of the electric toaster, sliced bread was toasted by placing it in a metal frame or on a long-handled toasting fork and holding it near a fire or over a kitchen grill.

From the 16th century onward, long-handled forks were used as toasters, "sometimes with fitment for resting on bars of grate or fender."

Wrought-iron scroll-ornamented toasters appeared in Scotland in the 17th century. Another wrought-iron toaster was documented to be from 18th-century England. The bar-gate toaster or lark spit also appeared in the 18th century.

Utensils for toasting bread over open flames appeared in America in the early 19th century, including decorative implements made from wrought iron.

Toasters before the use of electricity

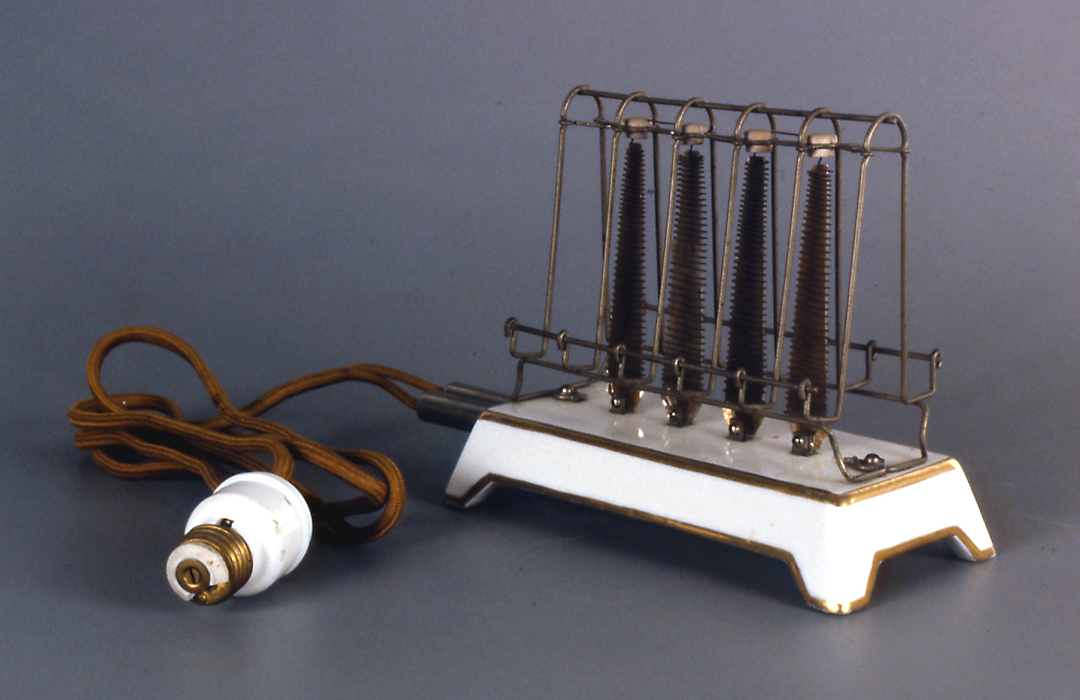
Toaster with an Edison screw fitting, c. 1909

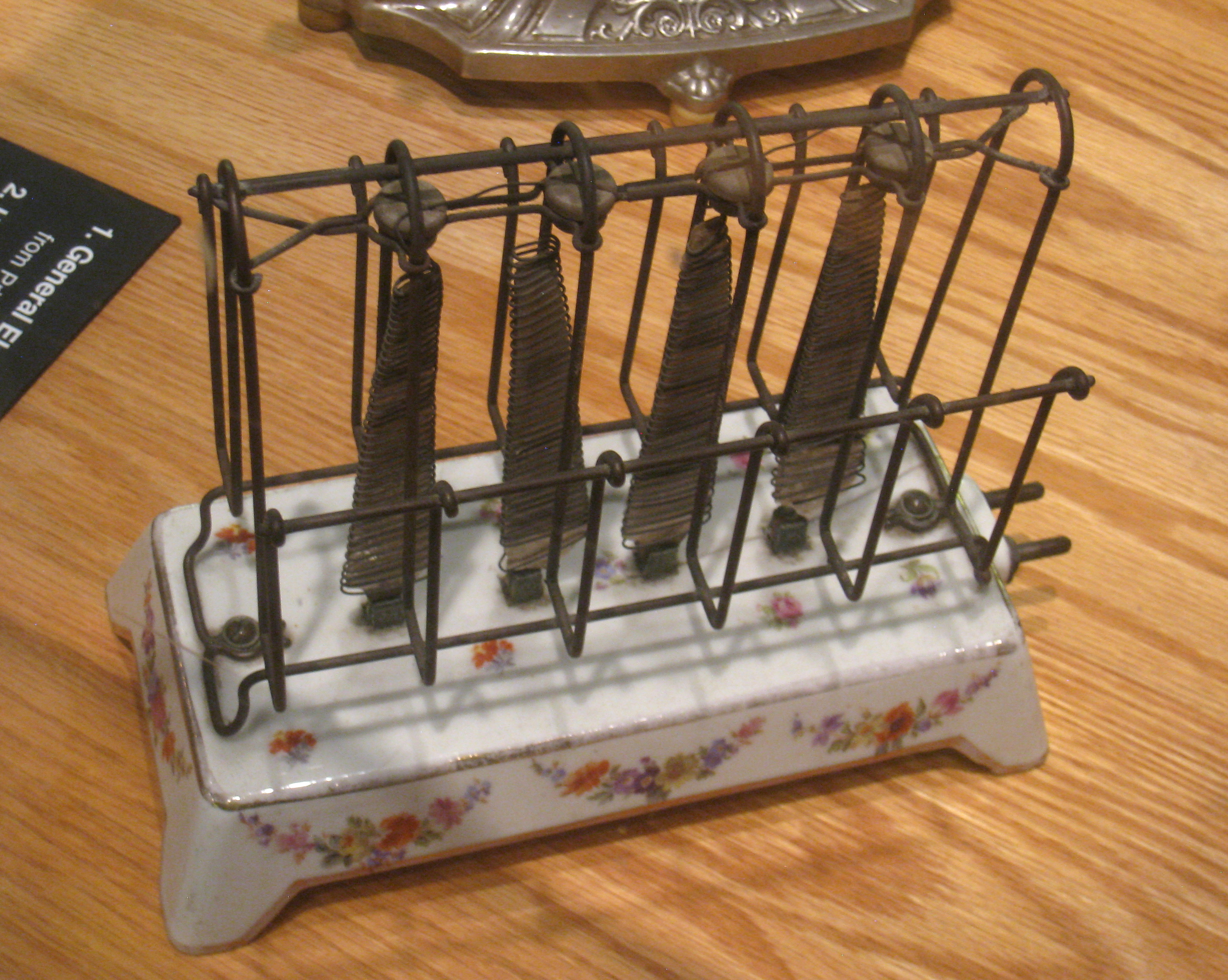
General Electric Model D-12 toaster, from 1910s

=== Development of the heating element ===
The primary technical problem in toaster development at the turn of the 20th century was the development of a heating element that would be able to sustain repeated heating to red-hot temperatures without breaking or becoming too brittle. A similar technical challenge had recently been surmounted with the invention of the first successful incandescent lightbulbs by Joseph Swan and Thomas Edison. However, the light bulb took advantage of the presence of a vacuum, something that could not be used for the toaster.

The first stand-alone electric toaster, the Eclipse, was made in 1893 by Crompton & Company of Chelmsford, Essex. Its bare wires toasted bread on one side at a time.

The problem of the heating element was solved in 1905 by a young engineer named Albert Marsh, who designed an alloy of nickel and chromium, which came to be known as nichrome.

The first US patent application for an electric toaster was filed by George Schneider of the American Electrical Heater Company of Detroit in collaboration with Marsh. One of the first applications that the Hoskins company considered for its Chromel wire was for use in toasters, but the company eventually abandoned such efforts, to focus on making just the wire itself.

The first commercially successful electric toaster was introduced by General Electric in 1909 for the GE model D-12.

=== Dual-side toasting and automated pop-up technologies ===
United States patent #1,394,450. "Bread-Toaster", patented 18 October 1921 by Charles Strite.

In 1913, Lloyd Groff Copeman and his wife Hazel Berger Copeman applied for various toaster patents, and in that same year, the Copeman Electric Stove Company introduced a toaster with an automatic bread turner. Before this, electric toasters cooked bread on one side, meaning the bread needed to be flipped by hand to cook both sides. Copeman's toaster turned the bread around without having to touch it.

The automatic pop-up toaster, which ejects the toast after toasting it, was first patented by Charles Strite in 1921. In 1925, using a redesigned version of Strite's toaster, the Waters Genter Company introduced the Model 1-A-1 Toastmaster, the first automatic, pop-up, household toaster that could brown bread on both sides simultaneously, set the heating element on a timer, and eject the toast when finished.

=== Toasting technology after the 1940s ===
In the 1980s, some high-end U.S. toasters featured automatic toast lowering and raising without the need to operate levers – simply dropping the bread into one of these "elevator toasters", such as the Sunbeam Radiant Control toaster models made from the late 1940s through the 1990s, began the toasting cycle. These toasters use the mechanically multiplied thermal expansion of the resistance wire in the center element assembly to lower the bread; the inserted slice of bread trips a lever switch to activate the heating elements and their thermal expansion is harnessed to lower the bread.

When the toast is done, as determined by a small bimetallic sensor actuated by the heat radiating off the toast, the heaters are shut off and the pull-down mechanism returns to its room-temperature position, slowly raising the finished toast. This sensing of the heat radiating off the toast means that regardless of the type of bread (white or whole grain) or its initial temperature (even frozen), the bread is always toasted to the same consistency.

=== Toasting technology from the 1990s to the present ===
Several projects have added advanced technology to toasters. In 1990, Simon Hackett and John Romkey created "The Internet Toaster", a toaster that could be controlled by the Internet. In 2001, Robin Southgate from Brunel University in England created a toaster that could toast a graphic of the weather prediction (limited to sunny or cloudy) onto a piece of bread. The toaster dials a pre-coded phone number to get the weather forecast.

In 2005, Technologic Systems, a vendor of embedded systems hardware, designed a toaster running the NetBSD Unix-like operating system as a sales demonstration system. In 2012, Basheer Tome, a student at Georgia Tech, designed a toaster using color sensors to toast bread to the exact shade of brown specified by a user.

A toaster that used Twitter was cited as an early example of an application of the Internet of Things. Toasters have been used as advertising devices for online marketing.

With permanent modifications, a toaster oven can be used as a reflow oven to solder electronic components to circuit boards.

== Similar inventions ==
=== Hot dog toaster ===
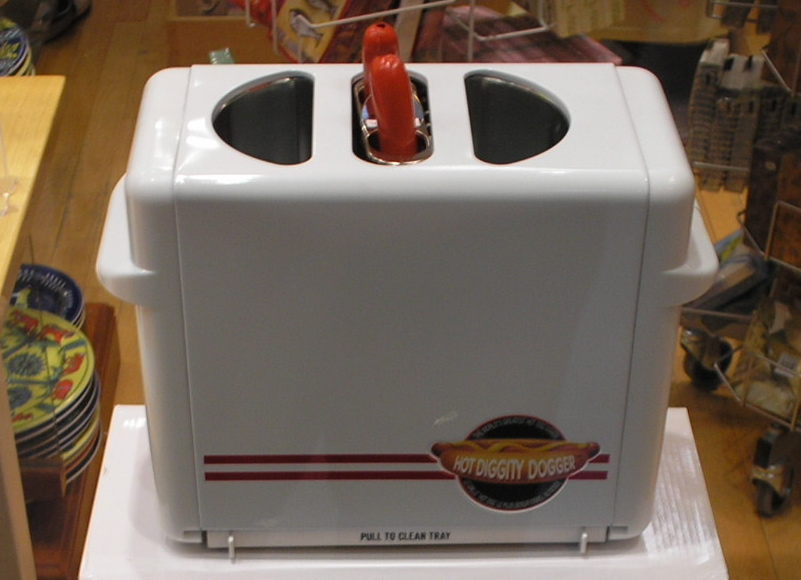
A hot dog toaster

A hot dog toaster is a variation on the toaster design; it can cook hot dogs without the use of microwaves or stoves. The appliance looks similar to a regular toaster, except that there are two slots in the middle for hot dogs and two slots on the outside for toasting the buns. Or there can be a set of skewers upon which hot dog are impaled.

== See also ==
- Alan MacMasters hoax
- Bachelor griller
- Dualit
- Heating Element
- List of cooking appliances
- List of home appliances
- Pie iron
- Thermal radiation
- Chilean toaster
