= 2015 Hyundai Construction Equipment 200 =

2nd race of the 2015 NASCAR Camping World Truck Series

2015 Hyundai Construction Equipment 200 200
Race details
- Race 2 of 23 of the 2015 NASCAR Camping World Truck Series
- Date: February 28, 2015
- Official name: 7th Annual Hyundai Construction Equipment 200
- Location: Atlanta Motor Speedway, Hampton, Georgia
- Course: Permanent racing facility
- Course length: 1.54 miles (2.48 km)
- Distance: 130 laps, 200 mi (322 km)
- Scheduled distance: 130 laps, 200 mi (322 km)
- Average speed: 140.711 mph (226.452 km/h)

Pole position
| Driver | Ben Kennedy | Red Horse Racing |
- Time: 31.378

Most laps led
| Driver | Matt Crafton | ThorSport Racing |
- Laps: 85

Winner
| No. 88 | Matt Crafton | ThorSport Racing |

Television in the United States
- Network: FS1
- Announcers: Mike Joy, Phil Parsons, and Michael Waltrip

Radio in the United States
- Radio: MRN

The 2015 Hyundai Construction Equipment 200 was the 2nd stock car race of the 2015 NASCAR Camping World Truck Series, and the 7th iteration of the event. The race was held on Saturday, February 28, 2015, in Hampton, Georgia at Atlanta Motor Speedway, a 1.54 mile (2.48 km) permanent tri-oval shaped speedway. The race took the scheduled 130 laps to complete. Matt Crafton, driving for ThorSport Racing, would put on a dominating performance, leading 85 laps to earn his 6th career NASCAR Camping World Truck Series win, and his first of the season. To fill out the podium, Ty Dillon, driving for GMS Racing, and Ben Kennedy, driving for Red Horse Racing, would finish 2nd and 3rd, respectively.

== Background ==
The layout of Atlanta Motor Speedway, the venue where the race was held.

Atlanta Motor Speedway is a 1.54-mile entertainment facility in Hampton, Georgia, United States, 20 miles (32 km) south of Atlanta. It has annually hosted NASCAR Sprint Cup Series stock car races since its inauguration in 1960.

The venue was bought by Speedway Motorsports in 1990. In 1994, 46 condominiums were built over the northeastern side of the track. In 1997, to standardize the track with Speedway Motorsports' other two intermediate ovals, the entire track was almost completely rebuilt. The frontstretch and backstretch were swapped, and the configuration of the track was changed from oval to quad-oval, with a new official length of 1.54-mile (2.48 km) where before it was 1.522-mile (2.449 km). The project made the track one of the fastest on the NASCAR circuit.

=== Entry list ===
- (R) denotes rookie driver.
- (i) denotes driver who is ineligible for series driver points.

| # | Driver | Team | Make | Sponsor |
|---|---|---|---|---|
| 1 | Morgan Shepherd (i) | MAKE Motorsports | Chevrolet | Life on the Line, Lilly Trucking |
| 02 | Tyler Young | Young's Motorsports | Chevrolet | Randco, Young's Building Systems |
| 4 | Erik Jones (R) | Kyle Busch Motorsports | Toyota | Toyota |
| 05 | John Wes Townley | Athenian Motorsports | Chevrolet | Zaxby's |
| 6 | Norm Benning | Norm Benning Racing | Chevrolet | Norm Benning Racing |
| 07 | Ray Black Jr. (R) | SS-Green Light Racing | Chevrolet | ScubaLife |
| 08 | Korbin Forrister (R) | BJMM with SS-Green Light Racing | Chevrolet | Tilted Kilt |
| 8 | Joe Nemechek | SWM-NEMCO Motorsports | Chevrolet | D. A. B. Constructors |
| 10 | Jennifer Jo Cobb | Jennifer Jo Cobb Racing | Chevrolet | Driven2Honor.org |
| 11 | Ben Kennedy | Red Horse Racing | Toyota | Local Motors |
| 13 | Cameron Hayley (R) | ThorSport Racing | Toyota | Cabinets by Hayley |
| 14 | Daniel Hemric (R) | NTS Motorsports | Chevrolet | California Clean Power |
| 15 | Mason Mingus | Billy Boat Motorsports | Chevrolet | Call Georgia 811 Before You Dig |
| 17 | Timothy Peters | Red Horse Racing | Toyota | Red Horse Racing |
| 19 | Tyler Reddick | Brad Keselowski Racing | Ford | DrawTite |
| 23 | Spencer Gallagher (R) | GMS Racing | Chevrolet | Allegiant Travel Company |
| 29 | Brad Keselowski (i) | Brad Keselowski Racing | Ford | Cooper-Standard Automotive |
| 31 | James Buescher | NTS Motorsports | Chevrolet | NTS Motorsports |
| 33 | Ty Dillon (i) | GMS Racing | Chevrolet | Rheem |
| 39 | Ryan Sieg (i) | RSS Racing | Chevrolet | Pull-A-Part, Big Green Egg |
| 50 | Cody Ware | MAKE Motorsports | Chevrolet | Burnie Grill, Bubba Burger |
| 51 | Daniel Suárez (i) | Kyle Busch Motorsports | Toyota | Arris |
| 54 | Justin Boston (R) | Kyle Busch Motorsports | Toyota | Discovering Lucy Angel |
| 63 | Garrett Smithley | MB Motorsports | Chevrolet | HeroBox, SEGPAY |
| 74 | Jordan Anderson | Mike Harmon Racing | Chevrolet | Tri-Analytics |
| 75 | Caleb Holman | Henderson Motorsports | Chevrolet | Food Country USA, Morning Fresh Farms |
| 86 | Brandon Brown | Brandonbilt Motorsports | Chevrolet | Brandonbilt Foundations |
| 88 | Matt Crafton | ThorSport Racing | Toyota | Fisher Nuts, Menards |
| 94 | Wendell Chavous | Premium Motorsports | Chevrolet | Vydox Plus |
| 98 | Johnny Sauter | ThorSport Racing | Toyota | Nextant Aerospace, Curb Records |
| 99 | Bryan Silas | T3R2 | Chevrolet | Kapoya Premium Energy Drink |
Official entry list

== Practice ==
The first and only practice session was held on Friday, February 27, at 2:30 PM EST, and would last for 2 hours and 55 minutes. Brad Keselowski, driving for his own team, Brad Keselowski Racing, would set the fastest time in the session, with a lap of 31.025, and an average speed of 178.695 mph (287.582 km/h).

| Pos. | # | Driver | Team | Make | Time | Speed |
|---|---|---|---|---|---|---|
| 1 | 29 | Brad Keselowski (i) | Brad Keselowski Racing | Ford | 31.025 | 178.695 |
| 2 | 4 | Erik Jones (R) | Kyle Busch Motorsports | Toyota | 31.028 | 178.677 |
| 3 | 13 | Cameron Hayley (R) | ThorSport Racing | Toyota | 31.062 | 178.482 |
Full first practice results

== Qualifying ==
Qualifying was held on Saturday, February 28, at 10:40 AM EST. The qualifying system used is a multi car, multi lap, three round system where in the first round, everyone would set a time to determine positions 25–32. Then, the fastest 24 qualifiers would move on to the second round to determine positions 13–24. Lastly, the fastest 12 qualifiers would move on to the third round to determine positions 1–12.

Ben Kennedy, driving for Red Horse Racing, would win the pole after advancing from the preliminary rounds and setting the fastest time in Round 3, with a lap of 31.378, and an average speed of 176.684 mph (284.345 km/h). Initially, Brad Keselowski posted the fastest time in Round 3, with a lap of 31.314, but his time would be disallowed after NASCAR determined that he did not cross the start/finish line before the qualifying time expired. Kennedy was the only driver to set a lap time in the third round.

No driver would fail to qualify.

=== Full qualifying results ===
| Pos. | # | Driver | Team | Make | Time (R1) | Speed (R1) | Time (R2) | Speed (R2) | Time (R3) | Speed (R3) |
|---|---|---|---|---|---|---|---|---|---|---|
| 1 | 11 | Ben Kennedy | Red Horse Racing | Toyota | 31.421 | 176.443 | 31.052 | 178.539 | 31.378 | 176.684 |
| 2 | 4 | Erik Jones (R) | Kyle Busch Motorsports | Toyota | 31.222 | 177.567 | 30.876 | 179.557 | – | – |
| 3 | 13 | Cameron Hayley (R) | ThorSport Racing | Toyota | 31.266 | 177.317 | 30.895 | 179.447 | – | – |
| 4 | 51 | Daniel Suárez (i) | Kyle Busch Motorsports | Toyota | 31.183 | 177.789 | 30.936 | 179.209 | – | – |
| 5 | 05 | John Wes Townley | Athenian Motorsports | Chevrolet | 31.450 | 176.280 | 30.953 | 179.110 | – | – |
| 6 | 54 | Justin Boston (R) | Kyle Busch Motorsports | Toyota | 31.684 | 174.978 | 30.977 | 178.971 | – | – |
| 7 | 8 | Joe Nemechek | SWM-NEMCO Motorsports | Chevrolet | 31.464 | 176.201 | 31.004 | 178.816 | – | – |
| 8 | 31 | James Buescher | NTS Motorsports | Chevrolet | 31.197 | 177.709 | 31.028 | 178.677 | – | – |
| 9 | 23 | Spencer Gallagher (R) | GMS Racing | Chevrolet | 31.242 | 177.453 | 31.037 | 178.626 | – | – |
| 10 | 29 | Brad Keselowski (i) | Brad Keselowski Racing | Ford | 31.660 | 175.111 | 31.038 | 178.620 | – | – |
| 11 | 19 | Tyler Reddick | Brad Keselowski Racing | Ford | 31.088 | 178.332 | 31.044 | 178.585 | – | – |
| 12 | 14 | Daniel Hemric (R) | NTS Motorsports | Chevrolet | 31.507 | 175.961 | 31.046 | 178.574 | – | – |
Eliminated in Round 2
| 13 | 98 | Johnny Sauter | ThorSport Racing | Toyota | 31.340 | 176.899 | 31.059 | 178.499 | – | – |
| 14 | 33 | Ty Dillon (i) | GMS Racing | Chevrolet | 31.348 | 176.853 | 31.137 | 178.052 | – | – |
| 15 | 88 | Matt Crafton | ThorSport Racing | Toyota | 31.186 | 177.772 | 31.139 | 178.040 | – | – |
| 16 | 17 | Timothy Peters | Red Horse Racing | Toyota | 31.828 | 174.186 | 31.338 | 176.910 | – | – |
| 17 | 15 | Mason Mingus | Billy Boat Motorsports | Chevrolet | 31.721 | 174.774 | 31.361 | 176.780 | – | – |
| 18 | 39 | Ryan Sieg (i) | RSS Racing | Chevrolet | 31.558 | 175.677 | 31.386 | 176.639 | – | – |
| 19 | 99 | Bryan Silas | T3R2 | Chevrolet | 31.747 | 174.631 | 31.499 | 176.006 | – | – |
| 20 | 75 | Caleb Holman | Henderson Motorsports | Chevrolet | 31.357 | 176.803 | 31.511 | 175.939 | – | – |
| 21 | 02 | Tyler Young | Young's Motorsports | Chevrolet | 31.656 | 175.133 | 31.624 | 175.310 | – | – |
| 22 | 07 | Ray Black Jr. (R) | SS-Green Light Racing | Chevrolet | 32.035 | 173.061 | 31.966 | 173.434 | – | – |
| 23 | 50 | Cody Ware | MAKE Motorsports | Chevrolet | 32.119 | 172.608 | 32.110 | 172.656 | – | – |
| 24 | 94 | Wendell Chavous | Premium Motorsports | Chevrolet | 31.843 | 174.104 | – | – | – | – |
Eliminated in Round 1
| 25 | 86 | Brandon Brown | Brandonbilt Motorsports | Chevrolet | 32.245 | 171.934 | – | – | – | – |
| 26 | 08 | Korbin Forrister (R) | SS-Green Light Racing | Chevrolet | 32.247 | 171.923 | – | – | – | – |
| 27 | 10 | Jennifer Jo Cobb | Jennifer Jo Cobb Racing | Chevrolet | 32.448 | 170.858 | – | – | – | – |
Qualified by owner's points
| 28 | 74 | Jordan Anderson | Mike Harmon Racing | Chevrolet | 32.545 | 170.349 | – | – | – | – |
| 29 | 63 | Garrett Smithley | MB Motorsports | Chevrolet | 32.634 | 169.936 | – | – | – | – |
| 30 | 1 | Morgan Shepherd (i) | MAKE Motorsports | Chevrolet | 33.746 | 164.286 | – | – | – | – |
| 31 | 6 | Norm Benning | Norm Benning Racing | Chevrolet | 36.491 | 151.928 | – | – | – | – |
Official qualifying results
Official starting lineup

== Race results ==
| Fin | St | # | Driver | Team | Make | Laps | Led | Status | Pts | Winnings |
|---|---|---|---|---|---|---|---|---|---|---|
| 1 | 15 | 88 | Matt Crafton | ThorSport Racing | Toyota | 130 | 85 | Running | 48 | $45,285 |
| 2 | 14 | 33 | Ty Dillon (i) | GMS Racing | Chevrolet | 130 | 0 | Running | 0 | $26,957 |
| 3 | 1 | 11 | Ben Kennedy | Red Horse Racing | Toyota | 130 | 1 | Running | 42 | $27,620 |
| 4 | 4 | 51 | Daniel Suárez (i) | Kyle Busch Motorsports | Toyota | 130 | 1 | Running | 0 | $21,261 |
| 5 | 11 | 19 | Tyler Reddick | Brad Keselowski Racing | Ford | 130 | 0 | Running | 39 | $18,707 |
| 6 | 13 | 98 | Johnny Sauter | ThorSport Racing | Toyota | 130 | 0 | Running | 38 | $16,667 |
| 7 | 2 | 4 | Erik Jones (R) | Kyle Busch Motorsports | Toyota | 130 | 37 | Running | 38 | $17,112 |
| 8 | 8 | 31 | James Buescher | NTS Motorsports | Chevrolet | 129 | 0 | Running | 36 | $13,612 |
| 9 | 16 | 17 | Timothy Peters | Red Horse Racing | Toyota | 129 | 0 | Running | 35 | $15,807 |
| 10 | 7 | 8 | Joe Nemechek | SWM-NEMCO Motorsports | Chevrolet | 129 | 0 | Running | 34 | $16,701 |
| 11 | 18 | 39 | Ryan Sieg (i) | RSS Racing | Chevrolet | 129 | 0 | Running | 0 | $13,446 |
| 12 | 5 | 05 | John Wes Townley | Athenian Motorsports | Chevrolet | 129 | 0 | Running | 32 | $15,557 |
| 13 | 9 | 23 | Spencer Gallagher (R) | GMS Racing | Chevrolet | 129 | 0 | Running | 31 | $15,501 |
| 14 | 3 | 13 | Cameron Hayley (R) | ThorSport Racing | Toyota | 129 | 0 | Running | 30 | $15,445 |
| 15 | 10 | 29 | Brad Keselowski (i) | Brad Keselowski Racing | Ford | 129 | 6 | Running | 0 | $13,657 |
| 16 | 6 | 54 | Justin Boston (R) | Kyle Busch Motorsports | Toyota | 129 | 0 | Running | 28 | $15,168 |
| 17 | 20 | 75 | Caleb Holman | Henderson Motorsports | Chevrolet | 127 | 0 | Running | 27 | $12,807 |
| 18 | 29 | 63 | Garrett Smithley | MB Motorsports | Chevrolet | 126 | 0 | Running | 26 | $14,919 |
| 19 | 12 | 14 | Daniel Hemric (R) | NTS Motorsports | Chevrolet | 126 | 0 | Running | 25 | $14,807 |
| 20 | 26 | 08 | Korbin Forrister (R) | BJMM with SS-Green Light Racing | Chevrolet | 125 | 0 | Running | 24 | $15,252 |
| 21 | 19 | 99 | Bryan Silas | T3R2 | Chevrolet | 123 | 0 | Running | 23 | $14,586 |
| 22 | 21 | 02 | Tyler Young | Young's Motorsports | Chevrolet | 123 | 0 | Running | 22 | $14,475 |
| 23 | 28 | 74 | Jordan Anderson | Mike Harmon Racing | Chevrolet | 123 | 0 | Running | 21 | $12,085 |
| 24 | 24 | 94 | Wendell Chavous | Premium Motorsports | Chevrolet | 120 | 0 | Running | 20 | $12,002 |
| 25 | 22 | 07 | Ray Black Jr. (R) | SS-Green Lighrt Racing | Chevrolet | 119 | 0 | Running | 19 | $14,375 |
| 26 | 27 | 10 | Jennifer Jo Cobb | Jennifer Jo Cobb Racing | Chevrolet | 118 | 0 | Running | 18 | $12,947 |
| 27 | 30 | 1 | Morgan Shepherd (i) | MAKE Motorsports | Chevrolet | 118 | 0 | Running | 0 | $11,891 |
| 28 | 17 | 15 | Mason Mingus | Billy Boat Motorsports | Chevrolet | 110 | 0 | Accident | 16 | $11,631 |
| 29 | 25 | 86 | Brandon Brown | Brandonbilt Motorsports | Chevrolet | 91 | 0 | Oil Line | 15 | $11,603 |
| 30 | 23 | 50 | Cody Ware | MAKE Motorsports | Chevrolet | 48 | 0 | Accident | 14 | $12,103 |
| 31 | 31 | 6 | Norm Benning | Norm Benning Racing | Chevrolet | 12 | 0 | Rear Gear | 13 | $9,603 |
Official race results

== Standings after the race ==
Drivers' Championship standings

| | Pos | Driver | Points |
|---|---|---|---|
| | 1 | Tyler Reddick | 87 |
| 3 | 2 | Matt Crafton | 85 (-2) |
| 1 | 3 | Erik Jones | 80 (–7) |
| 2 | 4 | Johnny Sauter | 72 (–15) |
| 7 | 5 | James Buescher | 63 (–24) |
| 2 | 6 | Bryan Silas | 60 (–27) |
| 15 | 7 | Ben Kennedy | 58 (–29) |
| 5 | 8 | Ray Black Jr. | 58 (–29) |
| 6 | 9 | Joe Nemechek | 58 (–29) |
| 3 | 10 | Korbin Forrister | 56 (–31) |
Official driver's standings

- Note: Only the first 10 positions are included for the driver standings.

| Previous race: 2015 NextEra Energy Resources 250 | NASCAR Camping World Truck Series; 2015 season | Next race: 2015 Kroger 250 |
