= Artusi (restaurant) =

Italian restaurant in Seattle, Washington, U.S.

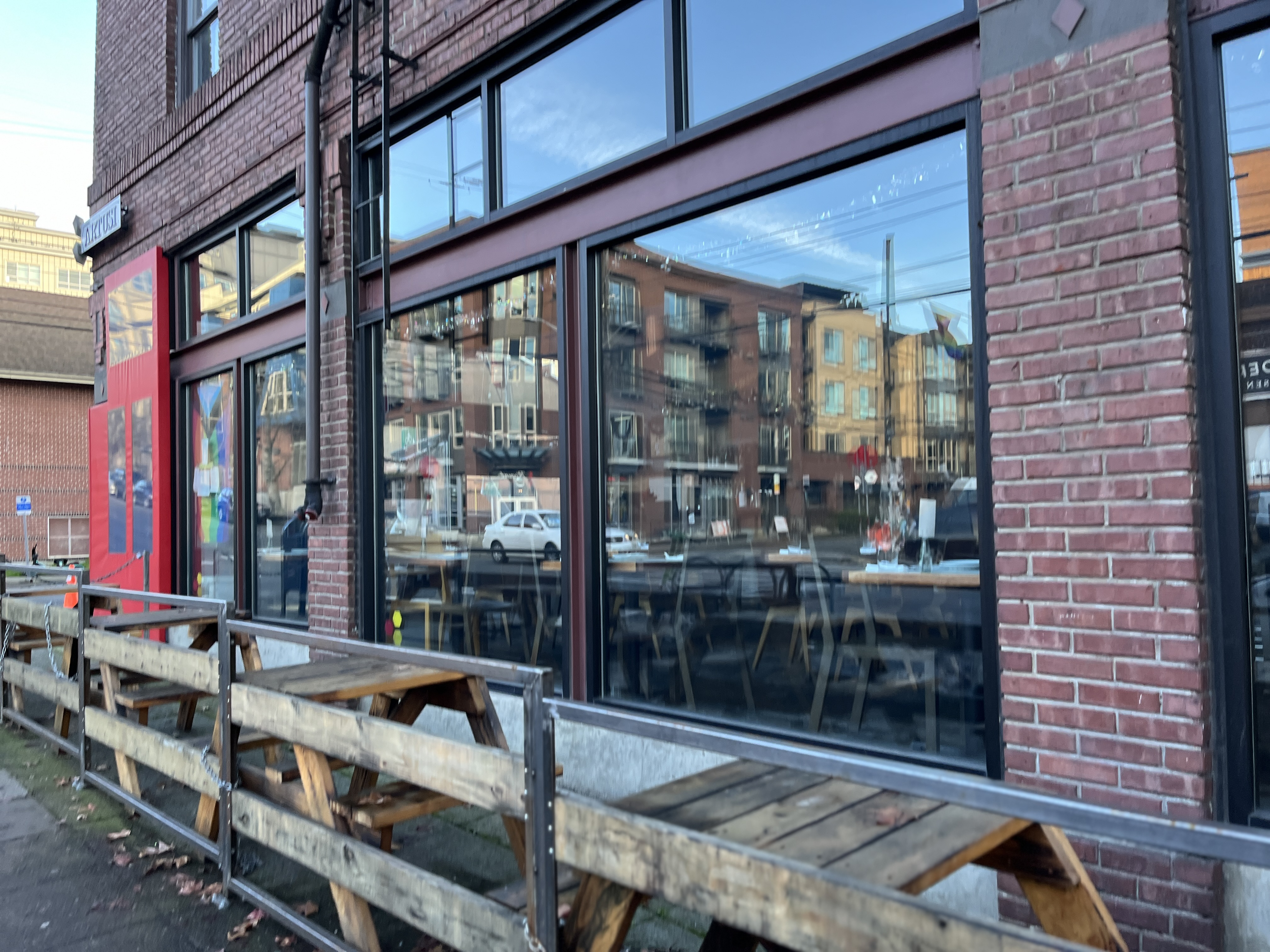
- The restaurant's exterior, 2023
- Interactive map of Artusi

Restaurant information
- Established: June 8, 2011
- Chef: Stuart Lane
- Food type: Italian
- Location: 1535 14th Avenue, Seattle, King, Washington, 98122, United States
- Coordinates: 47.6152°N 122.3144°W
- Website: artusibar.com

Artusi is an Italian restaurant in Seattle, in the U.S. state of Washington. It opened in 2011.

== Description ==
Artusi is an Italian restaurant and cocktail bar at the intersection of 14th Avenue and Pine Street on Seattle's Capitol Hill. It is considered a "sibling" restaurant to neighboring Spinasse. Condé Nast Traveler has described Artusi as "a casual drop-in Italian spot where you can sample revelatory cocktails while feasting on epic pasta and meatballs". Guide books by Moon Publications have described the restaurant as a "sunny, modern space", and Seattle Weekly has called Artusi clean and minimalist.

The menu has antipasti and desserts, including corn fritters with lime zest, salads, meatballs with marinara, and garlic bruschetta. Among cocktails on the drink menu are the Dead Glamour and The Carreras.

== History ==
Artusi opened on June 8, 2011. Stuart Lane is the chef.

The restaurant was closed during much of the COVID-19 pandemic, re-opening with dine-in service in October 2021.

== Reception ==
The Not for Tourists Guide to Seattle has said Artusi has a limited food menu and a "disappointing" beer selection. In 2023, The New York Times included Artusi in a list of Seattle's 25 best restaurants. Aimee Rizzo included the business in The Infatuation's 2023 list of the city's best Italian restaurants.

== See also ==
- List of Italian restaurants
