= Heat diffuser =

Cooking utensil

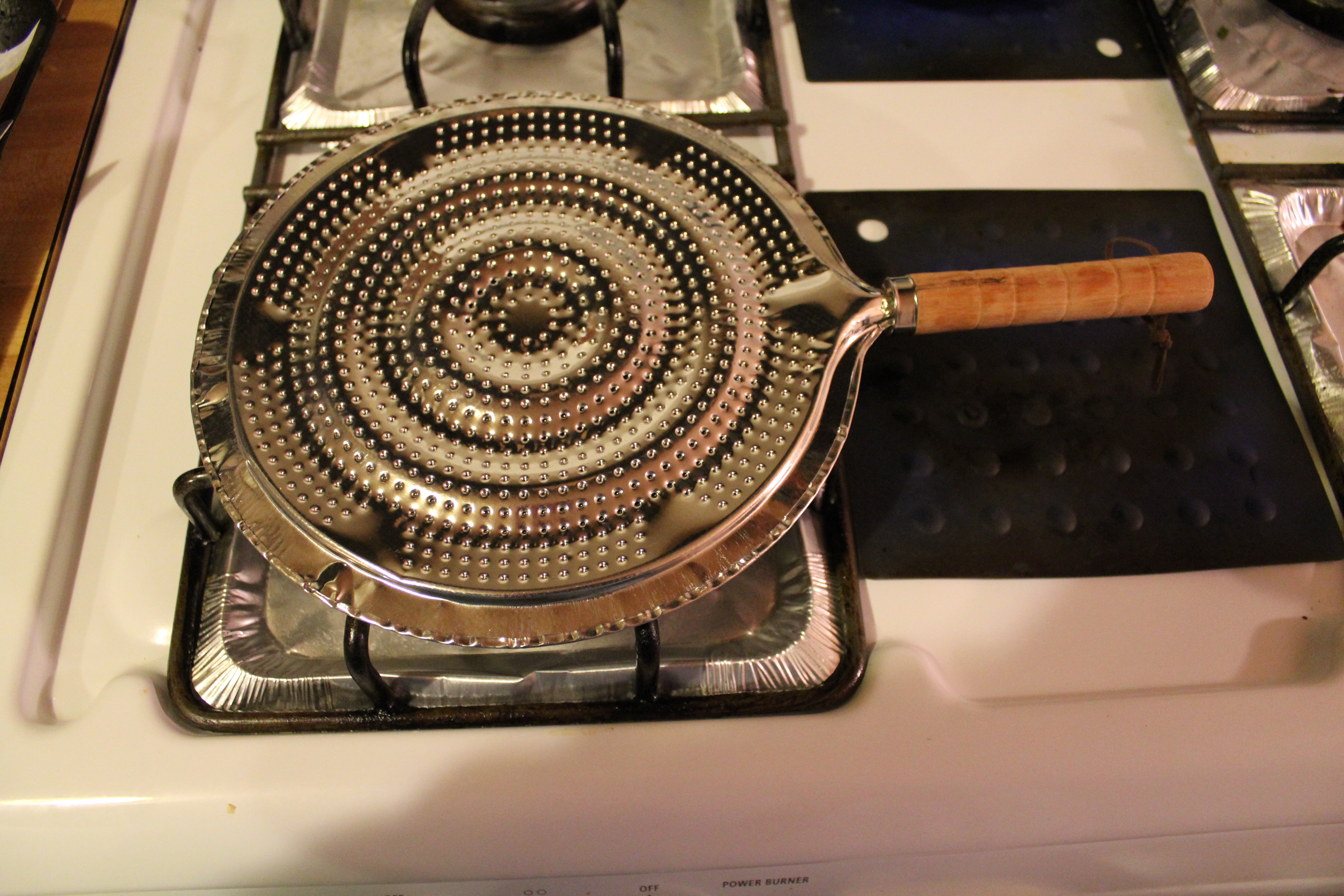
A heat diffuser on the stove

A heat diffuser, flame tamer, or simmering plate (UK) is a cooking utensil that is placed on top of a burner on a cooktop to separate the cooking pot or pan from the direct source of heat, making the heat more gentle and even.

== See also ==
- Brustolina
