= Big Green Egg =

Ceramic charcoal barbecue cooker

The Big Green Egg, Inc.
- Industry: Manufacturing
- Founded: 1974
- Founder: Ed Fisher
- Headquarters: Atlanta, Georgia,
- Key people: Dan Gertsacov (CEO)
- Products: Outdoor grills
- Website: biggreenegg.com

The Big Green Egg, Inc is an American privately held producer and manufacturer of kamado-style ceramic charcoal barbecue cookers and related accessories. The company is primarily known for producing The Big Green Egg, a line of various kamado grills identified by their egg-shape and distinctive dark green color.

== History ==
The Big Green Egg Company was founded in 1974 by Ed Fisher and is based in Atlanta, Georgia in the United States. Production of the Big Green Egg takes place in Monterrey, Mexico, by the company Daltile.

Since 1998, Big Green Egg has hosted an annual barbeque festival in the outskirts of Atlanta, Georgia, called Eggtoberfest. The 25th Eggtoberfest was celebrated in 2022 and drew more than 3,000 participants.

== Design ==
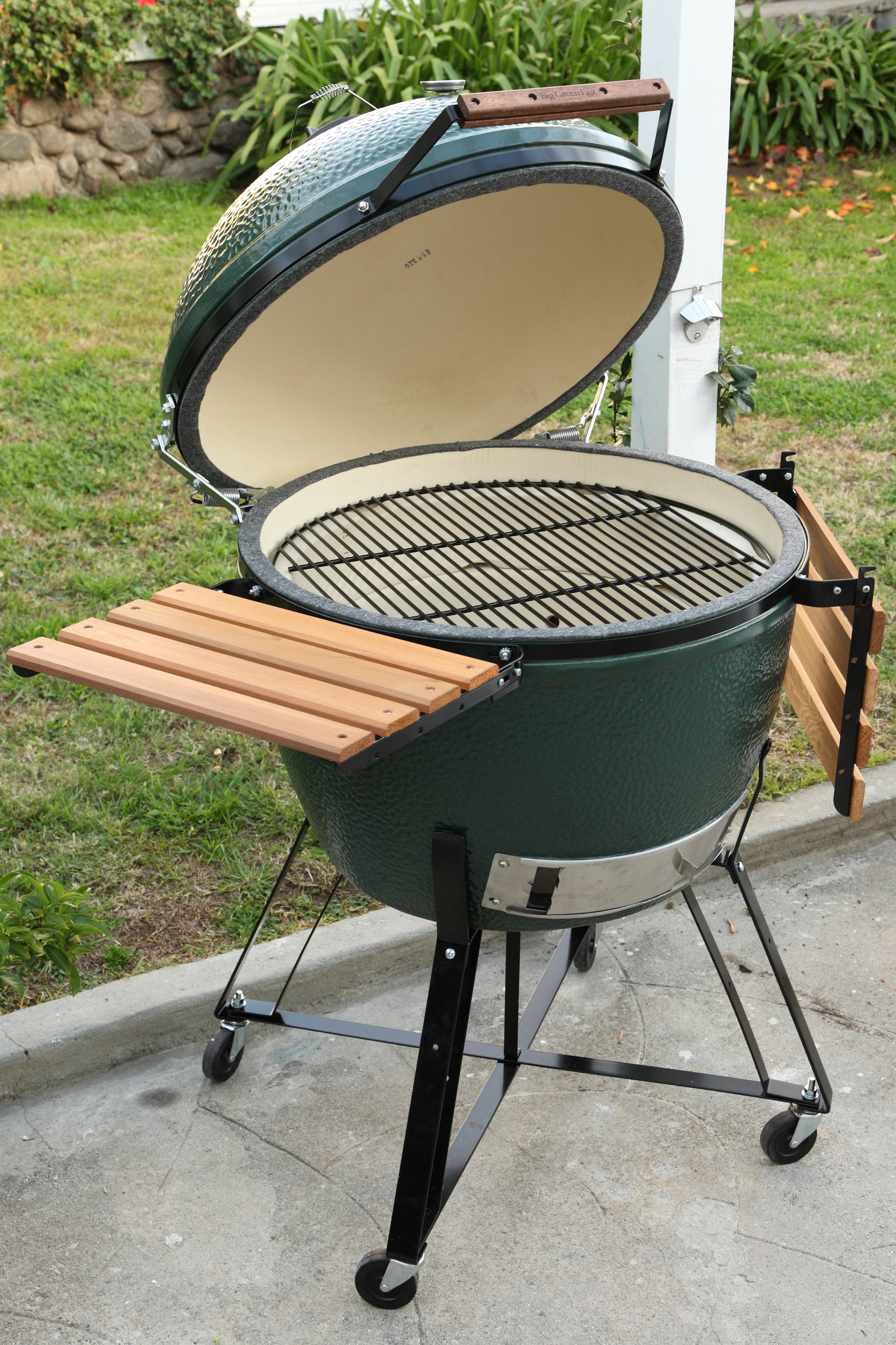
An XL Big Green Egg

The shape of the Big Green Egg is designed to contain the heat by using two draft doors, one at the bottom and another at the top. The bottom draft door slides horizontally creating more or less air flow. This works in conjunction with the top draft door, that swivels left and right, creating more or less updraft, and in turn adjusting the temperature used in the cook. The Big Green Egg is manufactured from ceramics designed to reflect heat, and the temperature gauge recommends not exceeding a maximum temperature of 750 degrees F.

The Big Green Egg is a charcoal barbecue: the manufacturers recommend lump wood charcoal because alternatives such as charcoal briquettes generate much more ash, and contain many additives that can contaminate the flavor of the food.

Big Green Eggs can be used for smoking or grilling and with the addition of accessories can bake bread or cook a pizza.

== Sizes ==
Big Green Eggs are manufactured in seven sizes.

	Mini	MiniMax	Small	Medium	Large	XLarge	2XL
Grid Diameter	10in / 25 cm	13in / 33 cm	13in / 33 cm	15in / 38 cm	18.25in / 46 cm	24in / 61 cm	29in / 74 cm
Weight	39 lbs / 18 kg	76 lbs / 35 kg	80 lbs / 36 kg	114 lbs / 52 kg	162 lbs / 73 kg	219 lbs / 99 kg	375 lbs / 170 kg
Able to Cook	2 chicken breasts	12-pound turkey, 4 burgers	12-pound turkey, 4 burgers	18-pound turkey, 6 burgers	20-pound turkey, 12 burgers	2 20-pound turkeys, 24 burgers	35-40 burgers, 14-16 whole chickens, 18-20 steaks

== Common accessories ==
- ConvEGGtor - a ceramic insert designed to facilitate cooking with indirect heat.
- Pizza stone - a ceramic insert to help cook pizza, cookies, or bread.
- EGG Nest - a metal frame to support the egg, with wheels for easier transportation.

== Motorsports ==
Big Green Egg sponsored NASCAR Xfinity Series driver #39 Ryan Sieg driving for RSS Racing at Chicagoland Speedway in 2014 and 2019.

In 2022 NASCAR Xfinity Series driver Anthony Alfredo won the Big Green Egg 150.

== See also ==
- Brustolina
- Hibachi
- Shichirin
