= Spinasse =

Italian restaurant in Seattle, Washington, U.S.

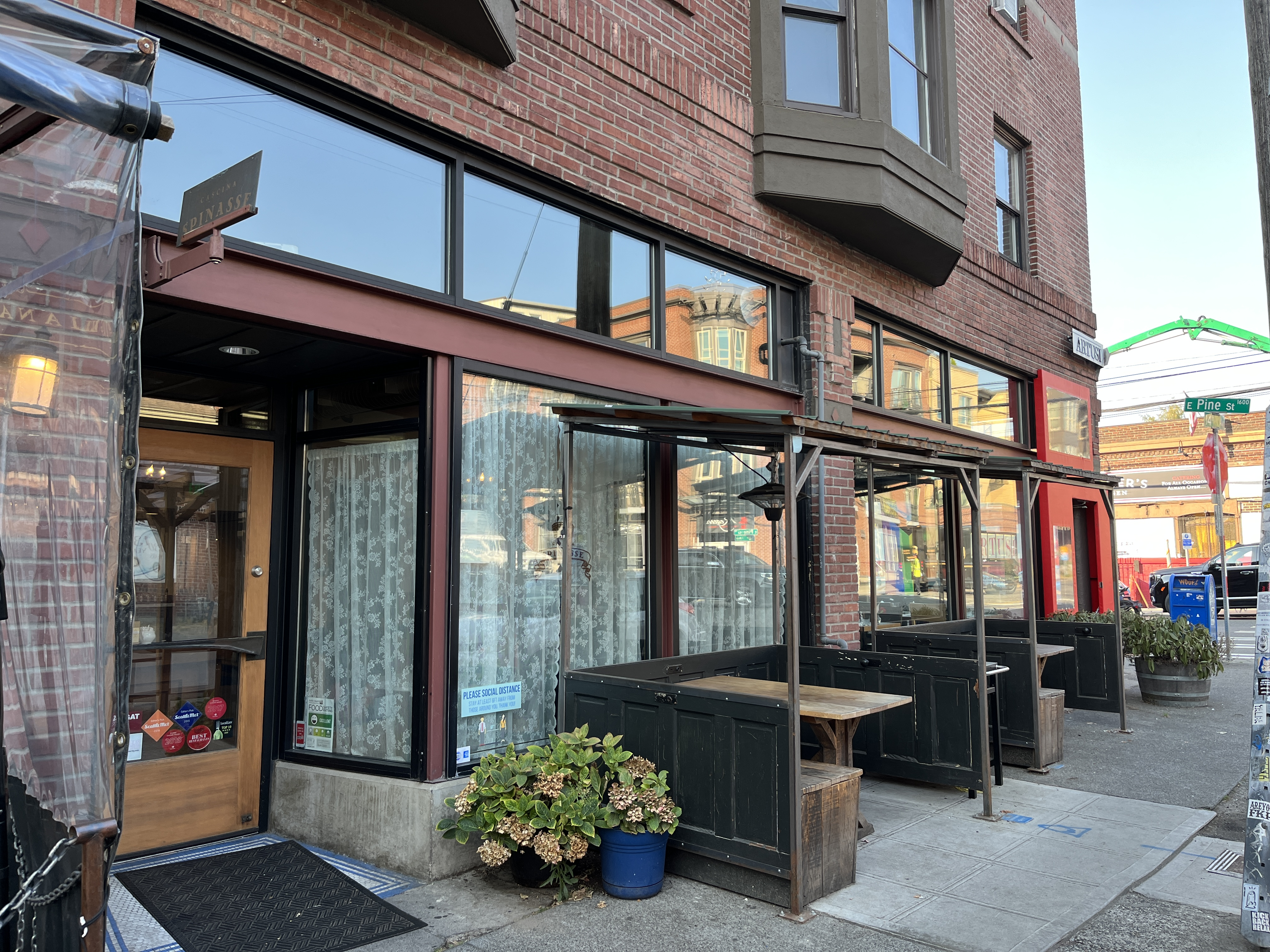
- Exterior of Spinasse (left) and neighboring "sibling" establishment Artusi (right), 2022
- Interactive map of Spinasse

Restaurant information
- Established: 2008
- Food type: Italian
- Location: Seattle, Washington, United States
- Coordinates: 47°36′54.3″N 122°18′52.1″W
- Website: spinasse.com

Spinasse (sometimes Cascina Spinasse) is an Italian restaurant in Seattle, Washington, United States. It was established in 2008.

== Description ==
Spinasse is an Italian restaurant in Seattle's Capitol Hill neighborhood. It neighbors "sibling" Italian restaurant and bar Artusi. Spinasse's menu focuses on cuisine from Piedmont, Italy. Menu options have included arugula salad, apple and quince crostata, lasagna, braised lamb, mascarpone cheesecake, and torta pasqualina. The dessert menu has included grilled peach with oatmeal gelato and cinnamon milk.

== History ==
Chef Stuart Lane replaced Jason Stratton in 2015.

== Reception ==
Seattle Metropolitan included the business in a 2022 list of "The Best Italian Food in Seattle". Jade Yamazaki Stewart included Spinasse in Eater Seattle's 2022 lists of "12 Seattle Area Restaurants Perfect for a Romantic Night Out" and "20 Date-Worthy Seattle Restaurants Actually Open on Mondays". Gabe Guarantee, Mark Van Streefkerk, and Stewart also included the restaurant in a 2022 list of "25 Essential Capitol Hill Restaurants". Spinasse was included in the website's 2025 overview of the best restaurants on Capitol Hill. Aimee Rizzo included Spinasse in The Infatuation's 2023 overview of Seattle's 25 best restaurants.

== See also ==
- List of Italian restaurants
