= Ice cube =

Frozen water in a cubic shape

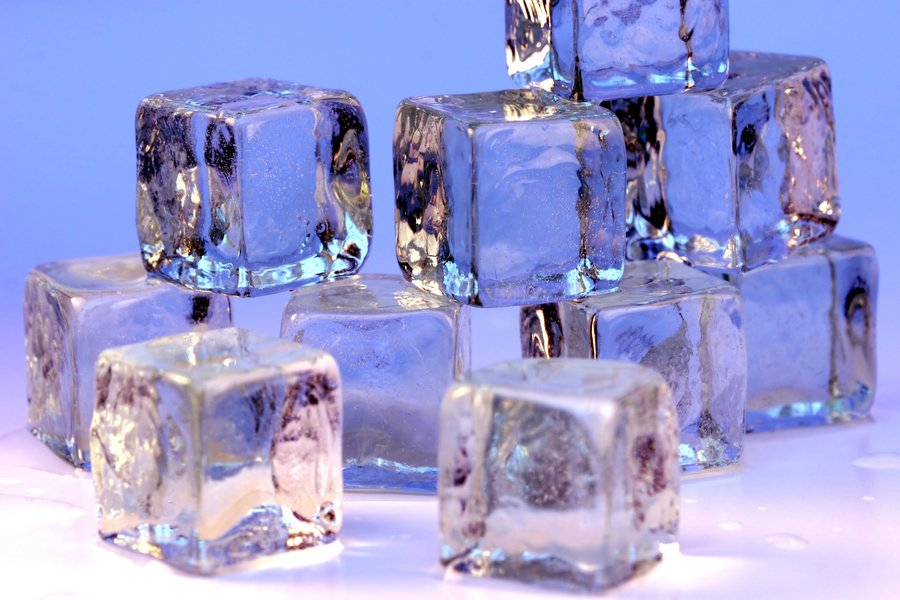
Ice cubes stacked

An ice cube is a small piece of ice, which is typically rectangular as viewed from above and trapezoidal as viewed from the side. Ice cubes are products of mechanical refrigeration and are usually produced to cool beverages. They may be made at home in a freezer with an ice tray or in an automated ice-making accessory. They may also be produced industrially and sold commercially.

== Origin of production ==
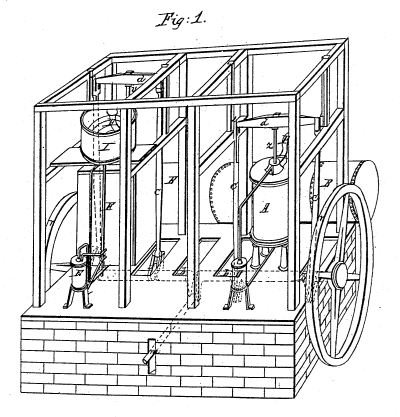
Gorrie's ice machine

American physician and inventor John Gorrie built a refrigerator in 1844 to produce ice in cool air. His refrigerator produced ice which hung from the ceiling in a basin to lower the ambient room temperature. During his time, bad air quality was thought to cause disease. Therefore, in order to help prevent and treat sickness, he pushed for the draining of swamps and the cooling of sickrooms.

== Production ==
=== Trays and bags ===
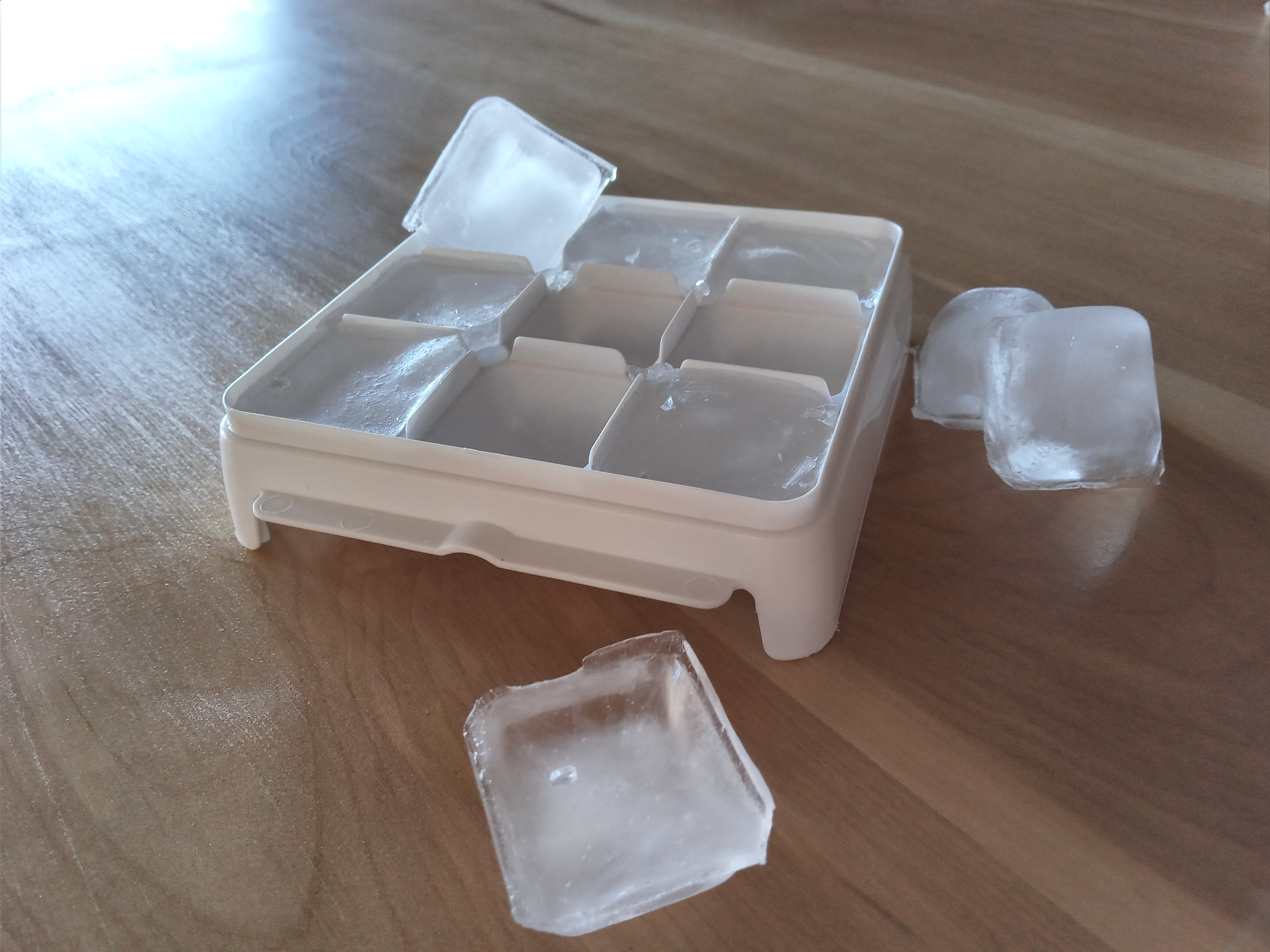
Ice cubes in a tray

Ice cube trays are designed to be filled with water, then placed in a freezer until the water freezes into ice, producing ice cubes. Ice trays are often flexible, so the frozen cubes can be easily removed by flexing the tray. "Twist ice trays" have a simple spring-loaded mechanism with a lever that is used to turn the tray upside down and flex at the same time, such that the cubes that drop are collected in a removable tray below. The spring returns the ice cube tray to its upright position without having to remove it from the freezer, which can save time and reduce accidental mess—though the tray has to be removed to be collected, the ice cube tray still has to be removed to be refilled. An alternative system is an aluminium tray with a lever that raises the ice cubes, freeing them from the tray. A motorized version of this is found in most automatic ice-making freezers.

While the usual shape of the ice cube is roughly cubical, some ice trays form hemispherical or cylindrical shapes; others produce blocks of ice in seasonal, festive, or other shapes. Occasionally, edible items are frozen inside ice cubes at home and in commercial production.

Lloyd Groff Copeman invented a rubber ice tray after noticing that slush and ice flaked off his rubber boots rather than adhering to them while walking through some woods collecting sap for maple syrup. Recalling this 1928 incident over lunch with his patent attorney, he conducted experiments using rubber cups, which led to practical designs and patents for different types of tray; these included a metal tray with rubber separators, a metal tray with individual rubber cups which was invented in 1933, and a tray made completely of rubber. Guy L. Tinkham, a household product executive, invented the first flexible, stainless steel, all-metal ice cube tray in 1933. The tray bent sideways to remove the ice cubes. Commercial pre-filled disposable ice trays for home freezing are designed to provide better taste and reduce the risk of contamination.

Danish inventor Erling Vangedal-Nielsen patented the single-use ice cube bag in 1978. He was inspired to do so after spending a night with friends where their need for ice was in excess of that which ice cube trays could provide; he, therefore, filled standard plastic bags with water and froze them, the ice to subsequently be retrieved with a hammer. The design was subsequently revised to feature individual compartments for each ice cube, with a seal at the bag's entry point. The ice cube bag has subsequently been marketed and adopted worldwide.

=== Mechanical ===
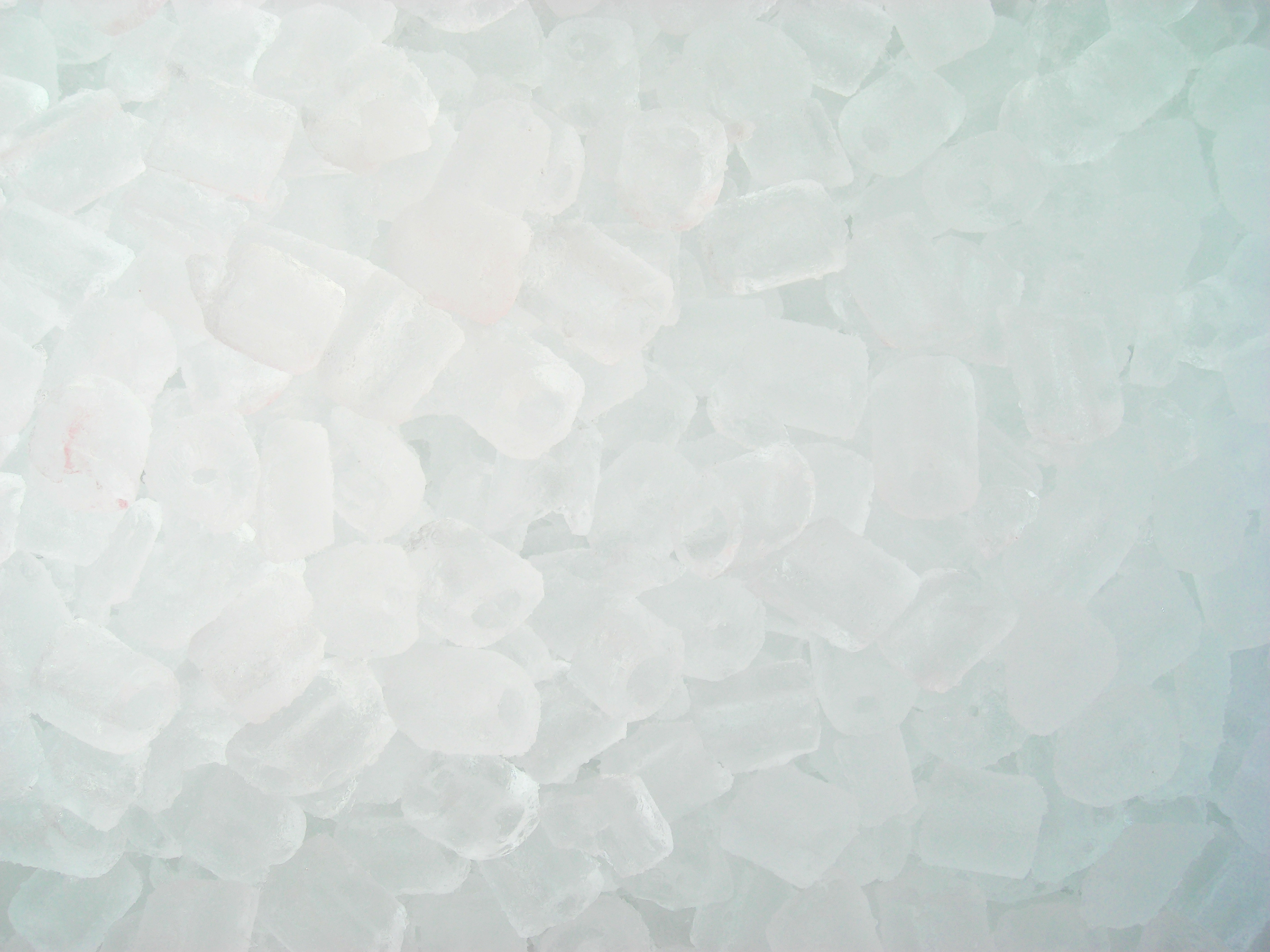
Hollow cylindrical ice "cubes" for cooling beverages

Dedicated ice-maker machines can be used to produce ice cubes for laboratories, home, and academic use. Ice cubes are also produced commercially and sold in bulk.

== Range of characteristics ==
=== Clear and cloudy ===
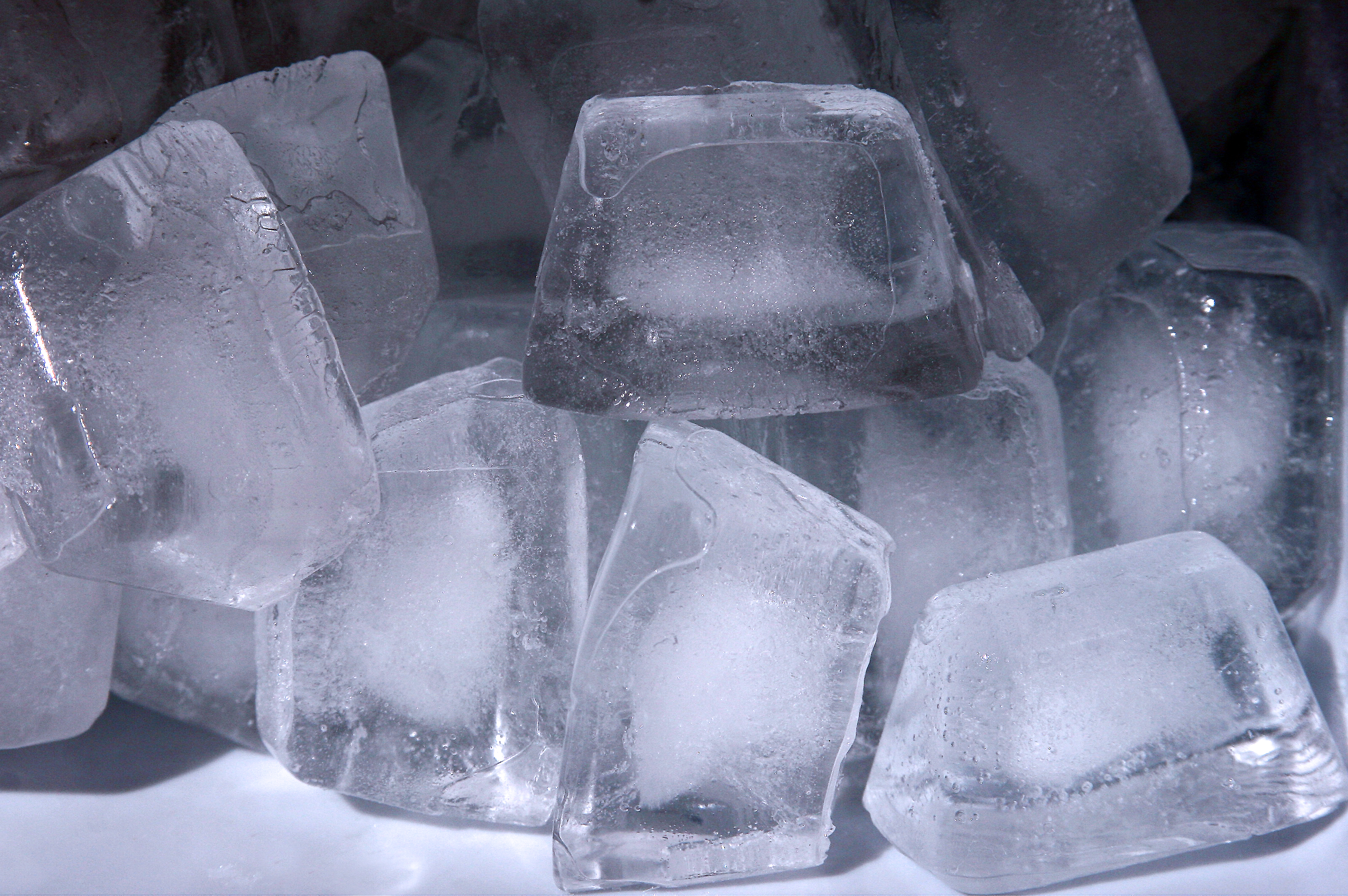
Cloudy ice cubes

Commercially made ice cubes may be clear, compared to domestically made ice cubes. Cloudy ice cubes occur when water is frozen quickly, or when the water is high in dissolved solids. When water is cooled to its freezing point, and ice starts to form, dissolved gases can no longer stay in solution and come out as microscopic bubbles. However, as ice floats in water, once there is enough ice to form a layer on the surface, the ice layer traps all bubbles within the ice cube. Commercial ice-makers use a flowing source of purified water to make ice with cooling elements at the bottom, allowing the bubbles to be washed away from the top as the cube grows.

=== Crushed ice ===
Crushed ice is the term for ice cubes that are crushed or sheared into irregularly shaped flakes to provide an aesthetic effect to some cocktails. Crushed ice is also used when faster cooling is desired since the number and average radius of the ice particles govern the cooling rate. Ice is often also crushed to form slushies, which can be both alcoholic and non-alcoholic. Crushed ice melts faster than solid ice: it has a greater surface area, so heat transfer is faster than solid ice.

Ice chips are small pieces of ice, which can be obtained by crushing cubes. They are often recommended before surgery or an invasive medical procedure. They may help to prevent oral mucositis or mouth sores associated with high-dose chemotherapy.

== Alternatives ==
An alternative to ice cubes for whiskey on the rocks are so-called whiskey rocks or stones. These are used to chill a drink without diluting it.

== See also ==
- Ice chips
- Ice pack
- Mpemba effect
- Pagophagia
- On the rocks
