= Bruschetta =

Italian appetizer

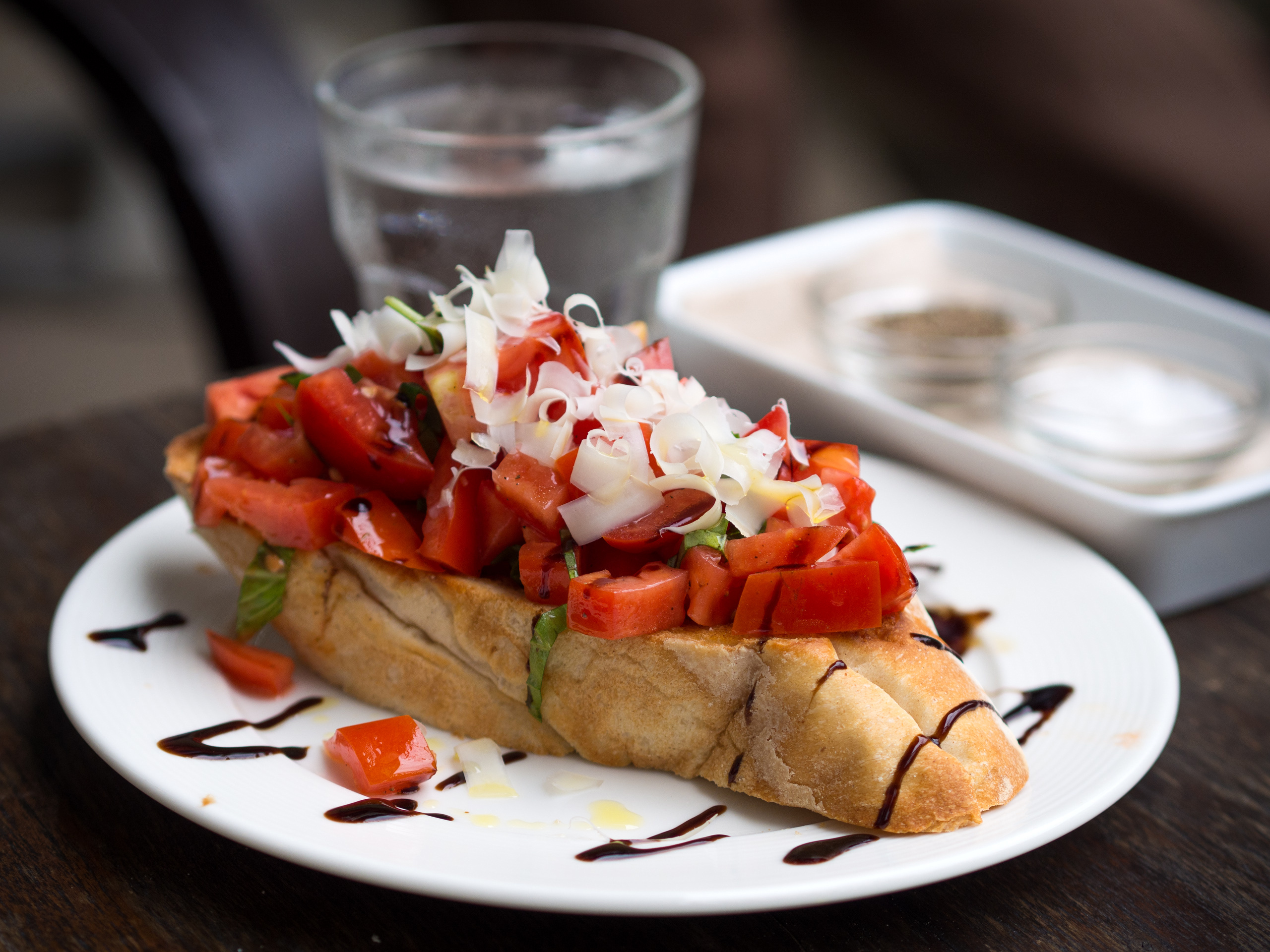
- Bruschetta topped with a tomato salad, caramelized balsamic vinegar and Grana Padano cheese
- Course: Antipasto
- Place of origin: Italy
- Serving temperature: Warm (bread only) or cold
- Main ingredients: Bread, garlic, olive oil
- Variations: Tomatoes, vegetables, beans, cured meat, cheese

Bruschetta (/bruˈskɛtə, -ˈʃɛtə/ broo-SKET-ə, -SHET-ə, Italian: [bɾuˈsketta]) is an Italian appetizer (antipasto) consisting of grilled bread topped with garlic, olive oil, and salt. Most commonly it is served with toppings of tomatoes, vegetables, beans, cured meat or cheese. In Italy, bruschetta is often prepared using a brustolina grill.

== Etymology ==
The noun bruschetta (pl.: bruschette) comes from the Romanesco dialect verb bruscare, the equivalent of the Italian word abbrustolire, which means 'to toast', or 'to roast over coals'.

Waverley Root noted in 1971 that bruschetto was the Roman term for the dish, with other Italians referring to it as schiena d'asino (lit. 'donkey's back').

In the United States, the word is sometimes used to refer to a prepared topping, sold in jars and usually tomato-based, instead of the bread, a sense which is unknown in Italian.

== History ==
Bruschetta was first documented in English by Elizabeth David in 1954. David observed in Italian Food that "bruschetta are eaten with the newly made oil" in the olive oil-producing districts of Tuscany and Umbria.

Waverley Root and Marcella Hazan trace the origins of bruschetta to ancient Rome. According to Root, ancient Romans called bruschetta clustrum or crustulum. An inscription found in the Sabine city of Cures documents that clustrum was distributed to people together with mulsum on important holidays such as Saturnalia. Hazan states that bruschetta's origins are "probably nearly as old as that of olive oil itself". In ancient Rome, the first taste of olive oil was "likely an oil-soaked piece of bread that may or may not have been rubbed with garlic". In modern times, bruschetta was a staple of the trattoria that made up "for the frugality of the fare". Over time, the dish gained popularity and made its way into the cuisines of higher social classes.

The International Culinary Center dates bruschetta to the Middle Ages, when toppings were served on bread instead of plates.

== Types ==
The version of bruschetta famous in America, a dish of bread topped with a diced tomato salad, is one of several types in Italy.

In the Abruzzo region, a variation of bruschetta made with ventricina is served. Raw pork products and spices encased in pig bladder are aged and the paste spread on open slices of bread which are sometimes grilled. The dish was developed as a way of salvaging bread that was going stale.

According to the International Culinary Center, the term bruschetta is sometimes used interchangeably with crostini and the Tuscan dish fettunta. In Tuscany, fettunta (from fetta unta, greasy slice [of bread]) is usually served without toppings, especially in November, to taste the first oil of the season.

In the Campania region, bruschetta made as it is known in America is the most popular, but is only eaten when tomatoes are in season. Other toppings used include salted anchovy and butter, and garlic-flavored beans with olive oil. In restaurants, toppings vary from bottarga (cured fish roe) to truffle.

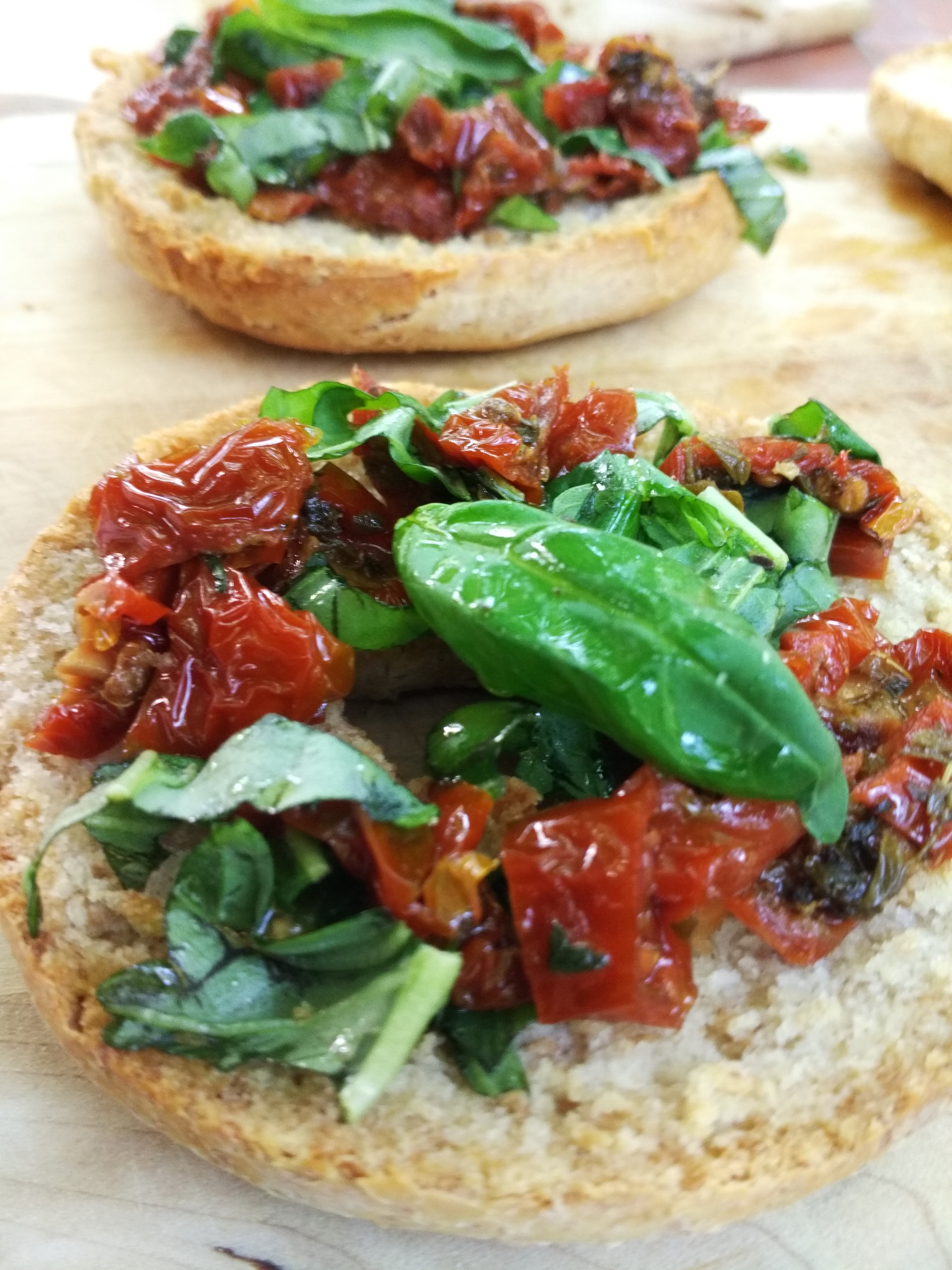
Bruschetta with chopped tomatoes and basil

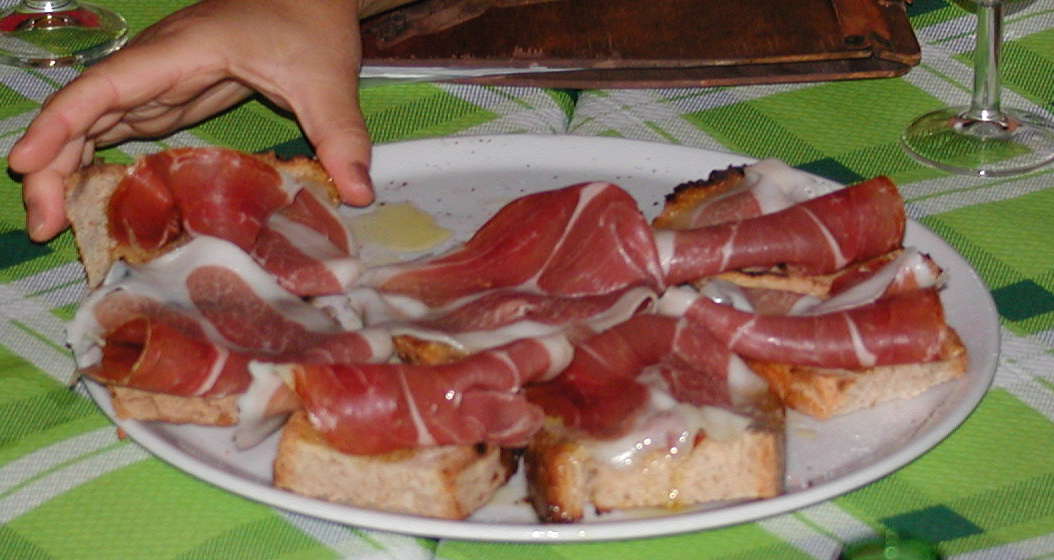
Bruschetta with olive oil and prosciutto

== See also ==
- List of bread dishes
- List of toast dishes
- Pa amb tomàquet – a similar dish in Catalan cuisine
- Torricado – a similar dish in Portuguese cuisine
