= Lloyd Groff Copeman =

American inventor

- Born: December 28, 1881; Hadley Township, Michigan, U.S.
- Died: July 5, 1956 (aged 74)
- Occupation: Inventor
- Family: Linda Ronstadt (granddaughter)

Lloyd Groff Copeman (December 28, 1881 – July 5, 1956) was an American inventor who devised the first electric stove and the flexible rubber ice cube tray, among other products. He had nearly 700 patents to his name, and he claimed that he could walk into any store and find one of his inventions.

== Early life ==
Copeman was raised by his Canadian parents, Caroline Estelle (née Groff) and John Wesley Copeman, on a farm in Hadley Township, Michigan which was later incorporated into Farmers Creek, Michigan, approximately 20 miles east of Flint, Michigan. He studied engineering at the former Michigan Agricultural College, now Michigan State University.

== Career ==
Copeman began his career as an apprentice at the Baldwin Locomotive Works in Philadelphia. Following that, he worked for electric utilities companies in Philadelphia and Spokane, as well as Detroit Edison and Consumers Power where he learned about electrical, marine and mechanical engineering, as well as steam fittings.

His first successful patented inventions, patented in 1909, were an electrothermostatic heat regulator for more effective control of stove and toaster heating elements and a thermostat for high-tension power cables.

Before this, while working for the Washington Electric Company in 1906, Copeman developed a design for an electric version of the gas stoves which had been available in Britain and the US for several decades. Development of the idea took several years, but in 1912 the Copeman Electric Stove Company was formed in the city of Flint, Michigan to produce the Copeman Electric Stove (also marketed as the "fireless cooker"). Westinghouse Electric Corporation bought the company in 1917, moved production to Mansfield, Ohio, and continued to develop and improve the stove.

From 1913, another of Copeman's inventions, a toaster with bread turner, was also produced by the Copeman Electric Stove Company. Electric toasters were a recent invention at that time—the first commercially successful version was patented in July 1909—and the bread had to be turned manually once the first side had been toasted. During a shopping trip, Copeman's wife Hazel gave them the idea for a toaster which turned the bread without manual intervention, and in 1914 a patent for what Copeman called the Automatic Toaster was filed in Hazel's name. Five other toaster-related patents were granted to both Lloyd and Hazel during the same year. The invention of the pop-up toaster in 1926 superseded Copeman's innovations, however.

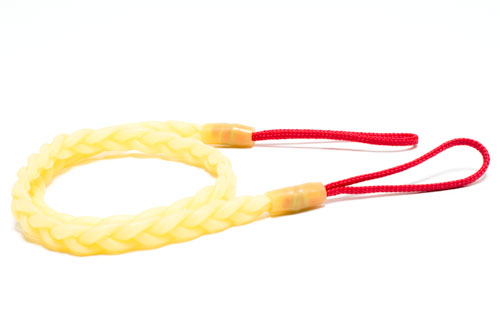
Flexo-Line Travel Clothesline, 2013

A company called Copeman Laboratories Company had been established in Flint, Michigan during the year 1918 to allow Copeman to dedicate his time to inventing, although he also spent a lot of time at his farm in Farmer's Creek, where he would lock himself in the basement—sometimes for up to a week, with his wife bringing him meals on a tray —and develop new ideas and products. Examples of his work at this time, which met with varying success, included injecting chickens with solutions to make their meat taste like beef; pioneering experiments in the development of latex; the Copeman Lubri-Cap, grease-filled paper cups for lubricating wheel bearings (the patent for this product was bought for $178,000 by the Alemite Manufacturing Corporation, the same corporation that also owned the patent rights to the Zerk fitting); Flexo-Line travel clotheslines, which are still manufactured today; a device to use dry ice to cool bottles of beer; self-extinguishing cigarettes; and a rust-reducing latex coating for motor vehicles.

Copeman's most successful and remunerative invention, however, was the rubber ice cube tray. One day in 1928, while walking through some woods collecting sap for maple syrup, he noticed that slush and ice flaked off his rubber boots easily, rather than adhering to them. Having recalled this incident over lunch with his patent attorney, he conducted experiments using rubber cups, and later set about designing and then patenting different types of tray: a metal tray with rubber separators, a metal tray with individual rubber cups, and a tray made completely of rubber. Sales from this invention earned Copeman approximately $500,000, equivalent to $10 million today.

== Personal life ==
Copeman married Hazel Dawn Berger, in 1904, and they had three children: Lloyd Berger Copeman (1907–1968), Ruth Mary Copeman Ronstadt (1914–1982), and Elizabeth Jane Copeman Gerlach (1918–1998).

His daughter, Ruth Mary Copeman Ronstadt, was the mother of recording artist Linda Ronstadt.

== Patents ==
March 11, 1909	U.S. patent 1,055,446	Thermostat and thermometer
August 5, 1913	U.S. patent 1,069,531	Electric switch
July 28, 1914	U.S. patent 1,104,718	Time-operating mechanism for electric switches
August 25, 1914	U.S. patent 1,108,552	Toast turner
August 25, 1914	U.S. patent 1,108,553	Toast turner
August 25, 1914	U.S. patent 1,108,554	Toaster
October 6, 1914	U.S. patent 1,113,154	Safety device for electrically heated cooking apparatus

=== 1915-1919 ===
1915

Electrical heating unit. No. 1,138,733; May 11

Electromagnetic switch. No. 1,141,174; June 1

Electric stove. No. 1,141,175; June 1

Electrically heated oven. No. 1,141,176; June 1

1916

Automatically controlled electrical cooking apparatus. No. 1,180,571; April 25

Collapsible grease-capsule. No. 1,190,382; July 11

1917

Grease-cup. No. 1,222,185; April 10

1918

Grease-cup. No. 1,269,159; June 11

Grease-cup. No. 1,287,889; June 11

Drill. No. 1,264370; April 30

Grease-cup. No. 1,287,889; December 17

1919

Grease-cup. No. 1,294,773; February 18

Grease-cup. No. 1,300,699; April 15

Adjustable thermometer. No. 1,312,834

Grease-cup. No. 1,292,594

Grease-cup. No. 1,314,073; August 26

Shank and handle. No. 1,314,078; August 26

=== 1920-1929 ===
1920

Heating apparatus. No. 1,336,552; April 13

Adjustable thermostat. No. 1,349,364

Toaster. No. 1,356,042; October 19

Tool holder. No. 1,361,021; December 7

1921

Refrigeration apparatus. No. 1,396,996

Grease-cup. No. 1,368,546; February 15

Grease-cup. No. 1,395,336; November 1

1922

Refrigerating apparatus. No. 1,409,283; March 14

Refrigerating apparatus. No. 1,415,992; May 16

Refrigerating apparatus. No. 1,430,153; September 26

Refrigerating apparatus. No. 1,430,154; September 26

1923

Refrigerating apparatus. No. 163,419; July 31

Refrigerating apparatus. No. 1,472,266; October 30

Refrigerating apparatus. No. 1,472,267; October 30

Refrigerator. No. 1,444,589; February 6

1924

Refrigerator latch. Re. 15,908; September 2

Refrigerator latch. No. 1,489,918; April 8

Refrigerator door construction. No. 1,503,486; August 5

Refrigerator lining. No. 1,509,932; September 30

Casting and plastic materials. No. 1,515,150; November 11

Casting stone. No. 1,518,254; December 9

Water control for refrigerating system. No. 1,519,757; December 16

Refrigerating apparatus. No. 1,517,534; December 2

1925

Refrigerating apparatus. No. 1,526,964; February 17

Wall construction. No. 1,526,965; February 17

Molding the shells of refrigerators. No. 1,538,467; May 19

Casting refrigerator doors. No. 1,538,467; May 19

Refrigerator. No. 1,538,469; May 19

Collapsible molding dies. No. 1,538,471; May 19

Refrigerator construction. No. 1,542,862; June 23

Refrigerator. No. 1,548,825; August 11

Bushing construction. No. 1,564,947; December 8

Refrigerator doors. No. 1,564,948; December 8

1926

Refrigerator manufacture. No. 1,570,617; January 26

Refrigerator construction. No. 1,574,868; March 2

Refrigerator. No. 1,603,905; October 19

Refrigerator apparatus. No. 1,585,016; May 18

1927

Refrigerator construction. No. 1,644,981; October 11

Drinking water supply for refrigerators. No. 1,618,514; February 22

Water cooler. No. 1,633,372; June 21

Match-plate pattern. No. 1,644,968; October 4

Refrigerator. No. 1,644,983; October 11

Refrigerator. No. 1,644,984; October 11

Refrigerator manufacture. No. 1,644,985; October 11

Refrigerator construction. No. 1,644,986; October 11

Refrigerator. No. 1,644,987; October 11

Cabinet construction and building the same. No. 1,644,988; October 11

1928

Sharp freezing container for mechanical refrigerators. No. 1,675,599; July 3

Refrigerator cabinet and controlling the temperature therein. No. 1,618,398; August 21

Table top construction. No. 1,656,422; January 17

Method and apparatus for accelerating setting of stone castings. No. 1,656,423; January 17

Making match plate patterns. No. 1667,720; May 1

Stone mold. No. 1,667,721; May 1

Match plate pattern. No. 1,667722; May 1

Table top construction. No. 1,667,723; May 1

Container for power refrigeration. No. 1,671,761; May 29

Cooling unit for refrigeration apparatus. No. 1,671,762; May 29

Refrigerating cabinet and controlling and operating the same. No. 1,681,399; August 21

Refrigerator or cabinet. No. 1,692,159; November 20

1929

Balloon construction. No. 1,714,097; May 21

Sharp freezing container for mechanical refrigerators. Re. 17,278; April 23, Re. 17,279; April 23

Table top construction. No. 1,700,155; January 29

Making stone castings. No. 1,700,156; January 29

Table. No. 1,701,529; February 12

Refrigerating device. No. 1,703,299; February 26

Artificial stone refrigerator and forming the same. No. 1,703,511; February 26

Refrigerator cabinet. No. 1,710,405; April 23

Refrigerating apparatus. No. 1,710,406; April 23

Method and apparatus for forming and maintaining sanitation in ice cream cabinets or the like.

No. 1,711,721; May 7

Storage compartments for ice cream cabinets or the like. No. 1,711,722; May 7

Flexible sharp freezing container. No. 1,740,919; December 24

=== 1930-1939 ===
1939 Refrigerating unit. No. 1,744,038; January 21

Method of refrigerator manufacture. No. 1,757,450; May 6

Water cooler. No. 1,771,433; July 29

Sharp freezing container. No. 1,777,483; October 7

Refrigerator cabinet. No. 1,777,786; October 7

Refrigerator. No. 1,777,787; October 7

Refrigerating unit of fired ceramic material. No. 1,781,778; November 18

Method and apparatus for positioning and sealing ice cream cans in ice cream cabinets.

No. 1,786,827; December 30

1931

Ice cream cabinet. No. 1,789.587; January 20

Sharp freezing container for ice cream cabinets. No. 1,807,587; June 2

Dispensing unit embodying mechanical refrigerator. No. 1,811,456; June 23

Sharp freezing unit. No. 1,816,211; July 28

Refrigerating unit. No. 1,816,638; July 28

Sharp freezing container. No.1,817,544; August 4

Sharp freezing container. No.1,817,545; August 4

Refrigerating apparatus and heat transfer therein. No. 1,818,673; August 11

Unit formed partially of fired ceramic material. No. 1,822,013; September 8

Apparatus for controlling the temperature of unit containers. No 1,824,535; September 22

1932

Sharp freezing unit. No. 1,839,651; January 5

Refrigerating system. No. 1,840,619; January 12

Refrigerating system. No. 1,840,702; January 12

Cooling chamber for mechanical refrigerating unit. No. 1,872,685; August 23

Method and apparatus for freezing liquids. No. 1,878,685; August 23

Flexible sharp freezing container. No. 1,879,602; September 27

Refrigerating unit. No. 1,879,922; September 27

Sharp freezing structure. No. 1,882,209; October 11

Method and apparatus for refrigerating. No. 1,887,580; November 15

1933

Refrigerating apparatus. No. 1,902,016; March 21

Cooling unit. No. 1,912,826; June 6

Cooling unit construction. No. 1,912,827; June 6

Mold construction for reproduction of patterns in rubber. No. 1,913,747; June 13

Clothespin. No. 1,916,556; July 4

Closure member and forming and applying. No. 1,916,857; July 4

1934

Refrigerating system. Re. 19,055; January 16

Storage and dispensing unit for frozen foods. No. 1,952,422; March 27

Treating fruit or other growing vegetable matter. No. 1,955,950; April 24

Waterproof and puncture-proof paper. No. 1,976,329; October 9

1935

Refrigerator structure. No. 2,002,339; May 21

Method and apparatus for cooling beer. No. 2,010,060; August 6

Protective coatings and applying and removing. No. 2,020,256; November 5

1936

No patents

1937

Protective coating and applying and removing. No. 2,082,791; June 8

Bucket and bucket protector. No. 2,071,112; February 16

Dispensing device for sheet rubber deposited from an aqueous dispersion of rubber and forming the same. No. 2,075,178; March 30

Device for making and storing ice. No. 2,088,840; August 3

Method and apparatus for conditioning and dispensing beer. No. 2,075,088; October 19

1938

Concrete or cement structure. No. 2,112,452; March 29

Apparatus for handling ice cubes. No. 2,113,014; April 5

Refrigerating structure. No. 2,114,996; April 26

Protecting and forming pre-finished metal. No. 2,120,461; June 14

Protective coating and process of applying and removing. No. 2,132,230; June 14

Package structure. No. 2,134,908; November 1

1939

Bird shelter. No. 2,151,010; March 21

Mounting bracket. No. 2,184,633; December 26

Dispensing device for sheet rubber deposited from an aqueous dispersion of rubber and forming and using same. Re. 21,065; May 2

Protective coating and applying and removing. No. 2,169,225; August 15

Coating knit articles and products thereof. No. 2,172,251; September 5

Portable beverage conditioning and dispensing apparatus. No. 2,182,116; December 5

Coating knit articles and products thereof. Re. 21,269; November 21

=== 1940-1949 ===
1940 Bird feeding station. No. 2,216,511; October 1

Birdhouse. No. 2,219,297; October 29

Cigarette and treating the same. No. 2,185,293; January 2

1941

Suet Cake container. No. 2,235,959; March 25

Flour sifter combination. No. 2,252,701; August 19

Container for confections. No. 2,248,963; July 15

1942

Collapsible birdhouse. No. 2,292,614; August 11

Birdhouse construction. No. 2,295,891; September 15

Treating textile fabrics and the products thereof. No. 2,281,830; May 5

1943

Clothesline. No. 2,318,275; May 4

Dispensing and using rubber. No. 2,307020; January 5

Closure member and applying same. No. 2,356,825; August 29

1945

No patents listed

1946

No patents listed

1947

No patents listed

1948

No patents listed

1949

Cream separator. No. 2,477,863; August 2

Apparatus for dispensing ice cubes. No. 2,484,017; October 11

=== 1950-1957 ===
1950

Ice tray. No. 2,514,476; July 11

Hand tool for agriculture implements. No. 2,528,947; November 7

1951

Method and apparatus for the manufacture of cigarettes. No. 2,543,277; February 27

1952

Spill guard for ice tray. No. 2,593,106; April 15

1953

Tractor hitch. No. 2,627,423; February 2

Bottle closure. No. 2,634,012; April 7

1954

2,688,236; Cl. 62-108.5

(Kisselle-ice tray grid) 2,671,321; March 9

1955

2,712,666; Cl. 15-142

2,704,732; Cl. 117-155

1956

Copeman, Lloyd Groff deceased; Elizabeth Jane (Betty), Gerlach, executrix Portable beverage conditioning and dispensing apparatus. No. 2,749,719; June 12

Cl. 62–91.5

1957

Moisture impervious container. No. 2,781,159; February 12

Cl. 229-16
