= Torricado =

Bread dish from Ribatejo, Portugal

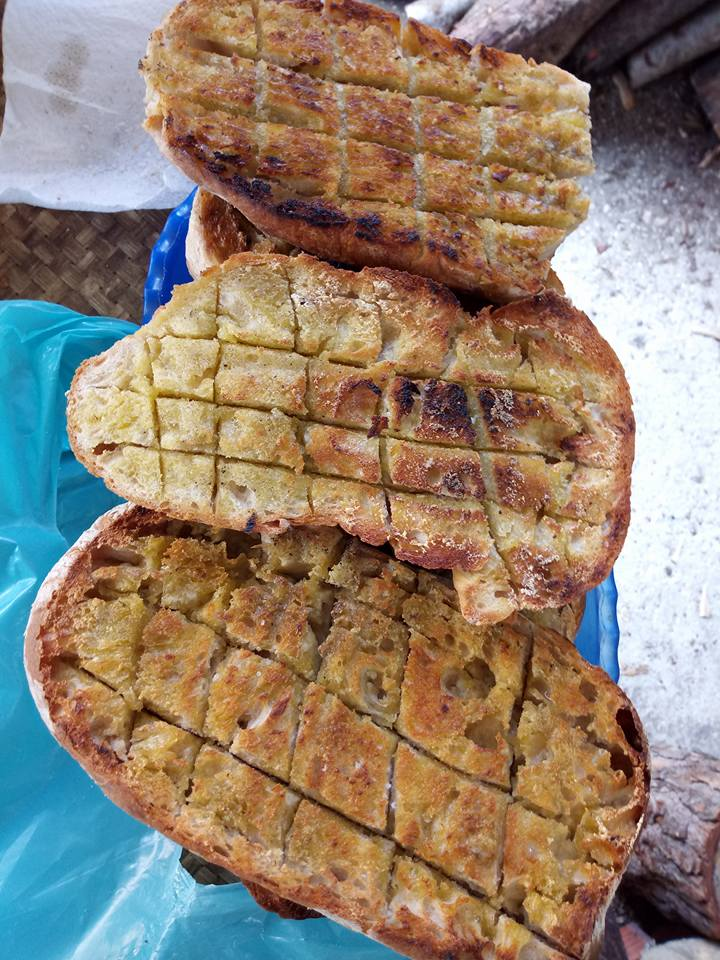
Typical aspect of the bread after being toasted, soaked and brushed

Torricado is a culinary specialty from the Ribatejo region of Portugal, consisting of pieces of bread toasted over charcoal, soaked in olive oil and brushed with garlic and salt. It is served mainly as a side dish to grilled salt cod, but also to sardines and pork. The dish is common both to the Tagus riverside plains and the hill rugged area of the vineyards, mainly in the area of Almeirim, Azambuja, Cartaxo and Santarém municipalities.

== Background ==
Torricado originates from the subsistence of rural workers, as an inexpensive and practical way of making lunch while at work in the fields. It is nowadays usually served in family reunions and friend gatherings, as well as in some local festivities.

== Preparation ==
A large bread, usually aged by two days, is cut longitudinally in halves, the inner part sliced in several diamond shaped crumbs and placed over a charcoal fire to toast. The bread is later brushed with a garlic clove and olive oil and salt are added in the meantime, during the roasting process.

Garlic and olive oil are a common feature in the local cuisine, and salted cod is a traditional ingredient in the Portuguese diet.
