= Brustolina =

Stovetop toaster and grill

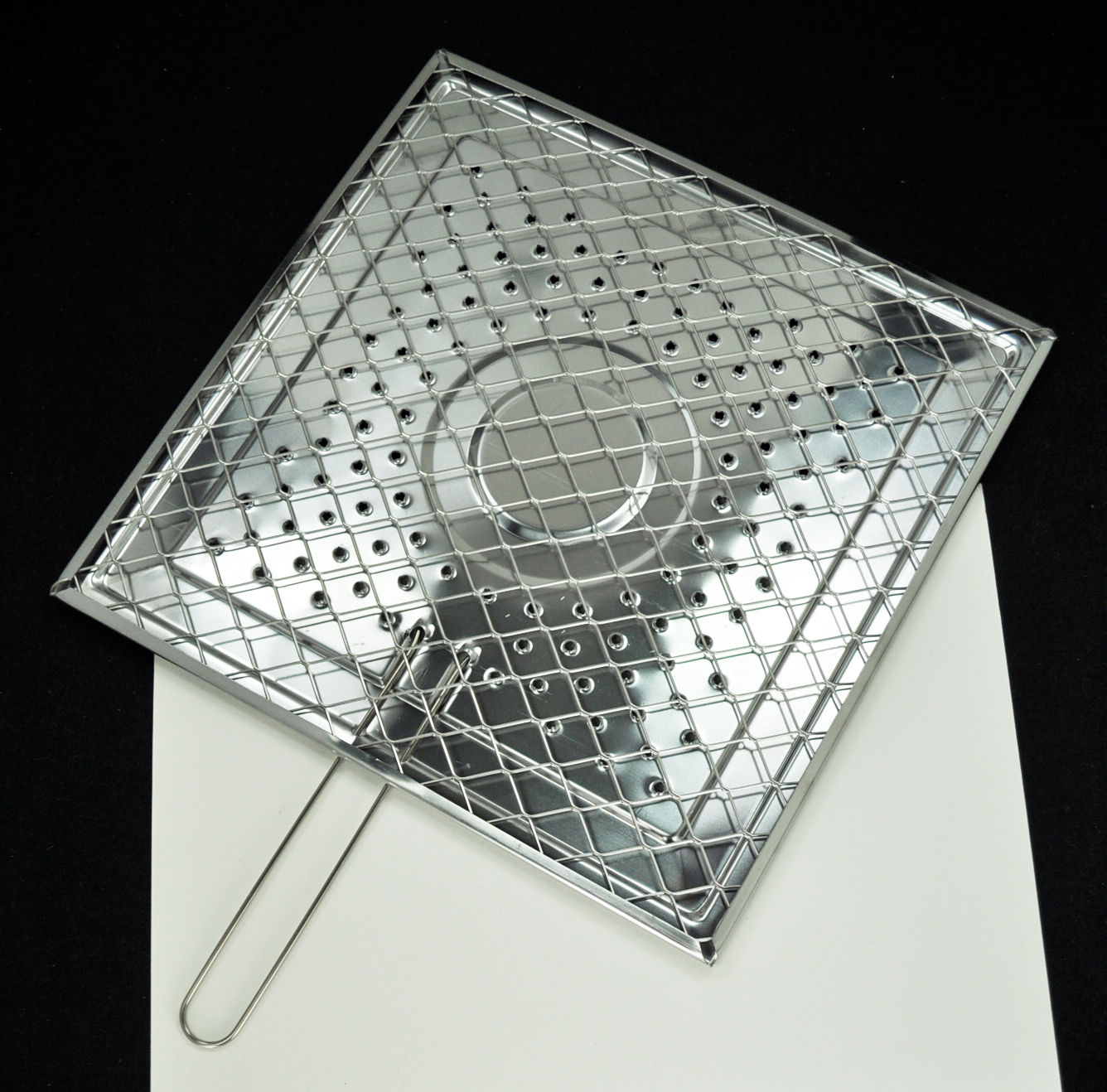
The brustolina is common in kitchens throughout Italy. This grill (graticola) is used for more than just toasting bread (tostapane). On the stove, the brustolina diffuses heat evenly to quickly heat slices of bread, to crisp bread for bruschetta, to crisp slices of polenta, to roast peppers, cook rice, and more.

The brustolina is a grill which fits over a gas burner on a hob. It consists of a square sheet of metal with holes punched in it (the base) and a square grid over the top (the grilling surface). Heat is applied from below and is evenly distributed by the base, deflected upward to the grid. Items placed on top of the grid are cooked by both convection and radiant heat. These grills are often used in Italy and Chile, for instance, grilling bruschetta, polenta, vegetables or toasted pumpkin seeds.

A brustolina can also be used as a heat diffuser, to provide well-distributed low heat, for example for cooking rice.

Similar grills are used for making toast over campfires and in Japanese cooking.

== See also ==
- Chilean toaster
