= Chilean toaster =

Kitchen appliance

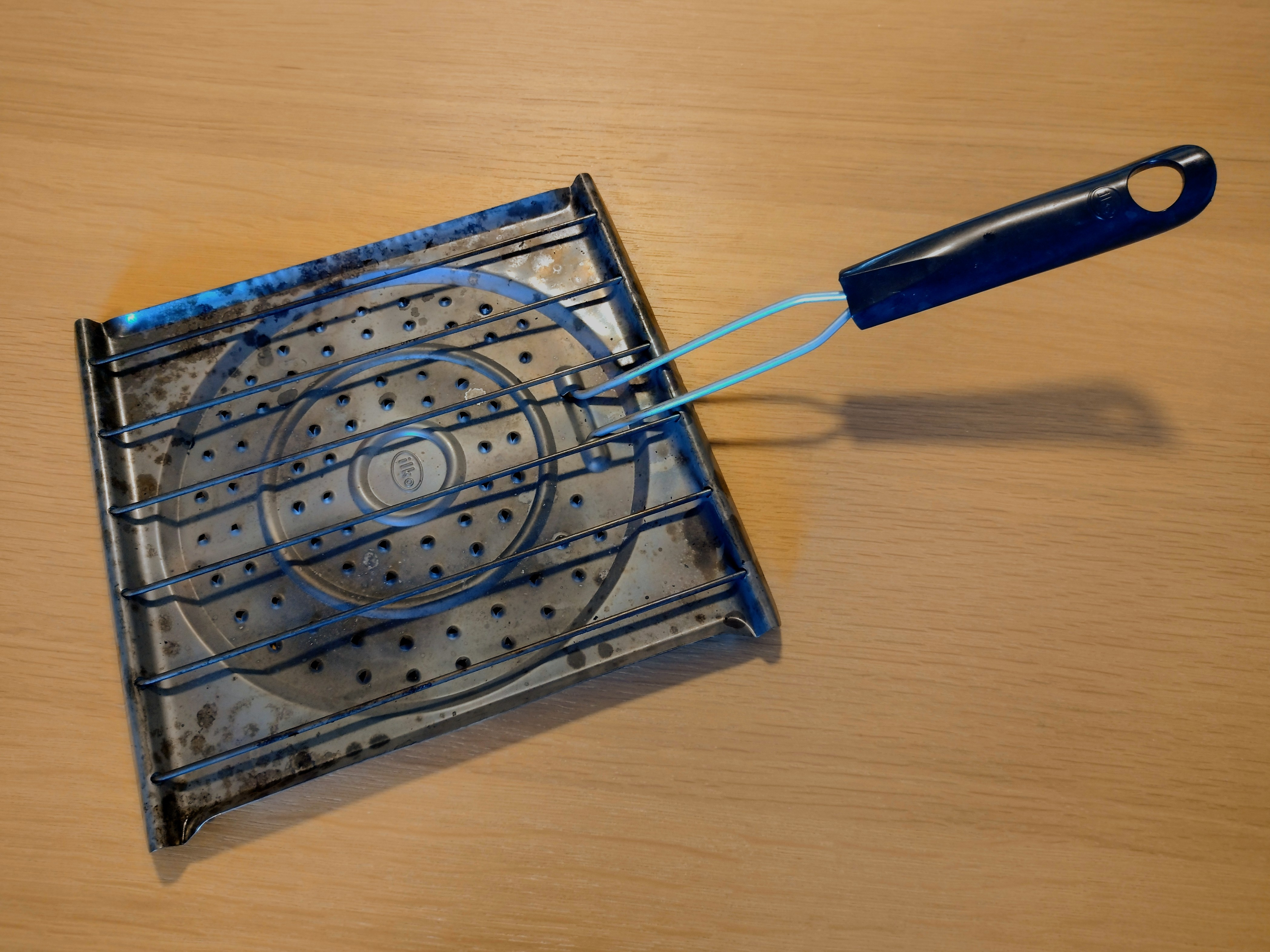
Chilean toaster

The Chilean toaster (tostador chileno) is a kitchen appliance created in Chile around the 1920s and popularized from the 1950s onwards. It is an appliance usually used in gas stoves and is one of the traditional kitchen utensils of Chile, making it a characteristic part of its popular culture; among the foods that are usually heated or prepared using a Chilean toaster are bread (especially marraqueta), humitas, sopaipillas and rice.

In Italy there is a variation known as brustolina.

== History ==
At the end of the 19th century, there were tin toasters in countries in the northern hemisphere, which, unlike the Chilean toaster, had a completely flat surface under the grill. An example of this can be seen in a mail order catalogue published in Cleveland in 1893.

The Chilean toaster was created around 1920 by craftsmen who designed a tin appliance with holes in its surface, attached to a wire that served as a handle and that was used to heat food on the stoves of kitchens used in the Chilean countryside, serving as a heat diffuser. One of its characteristics is its folding handle, which allows for better storage, and its handle that has been made from different materials, including metal, wood or plastic.

Among the advantages of the Chilean toaster is that it can be used to heat any type of food placed on its surface, especially bread, since electric toasters generally only accept thin slices of bread, which contrasts with the varieties consumed in Chile such as marraqueta or hallulla.

Since 1950, the Chilean toaster began to be mass produced, mainly through the company Virutex Ilko, which developed a special robot that makes the utensils, using in 2010 twenty tons of tinplate and 100 kilometers of galvanized wire each month to make one million toasters each year; by 2022 production was 20,000 toasters per month. In addition to national production, Virutex Ilko exports toasters to countries such as Mexico, Argentina, Peru, Ecuador, Costa Rica and Colombia; in the latter country it is known as "arepa toaster" (tostador de arepas), while in Spain it is known as "gas toaster" (tostador para gas).

== See also ==
- Chilean cuisine
- Brustolina
