= Le Coucou =

French restaurant in New York City

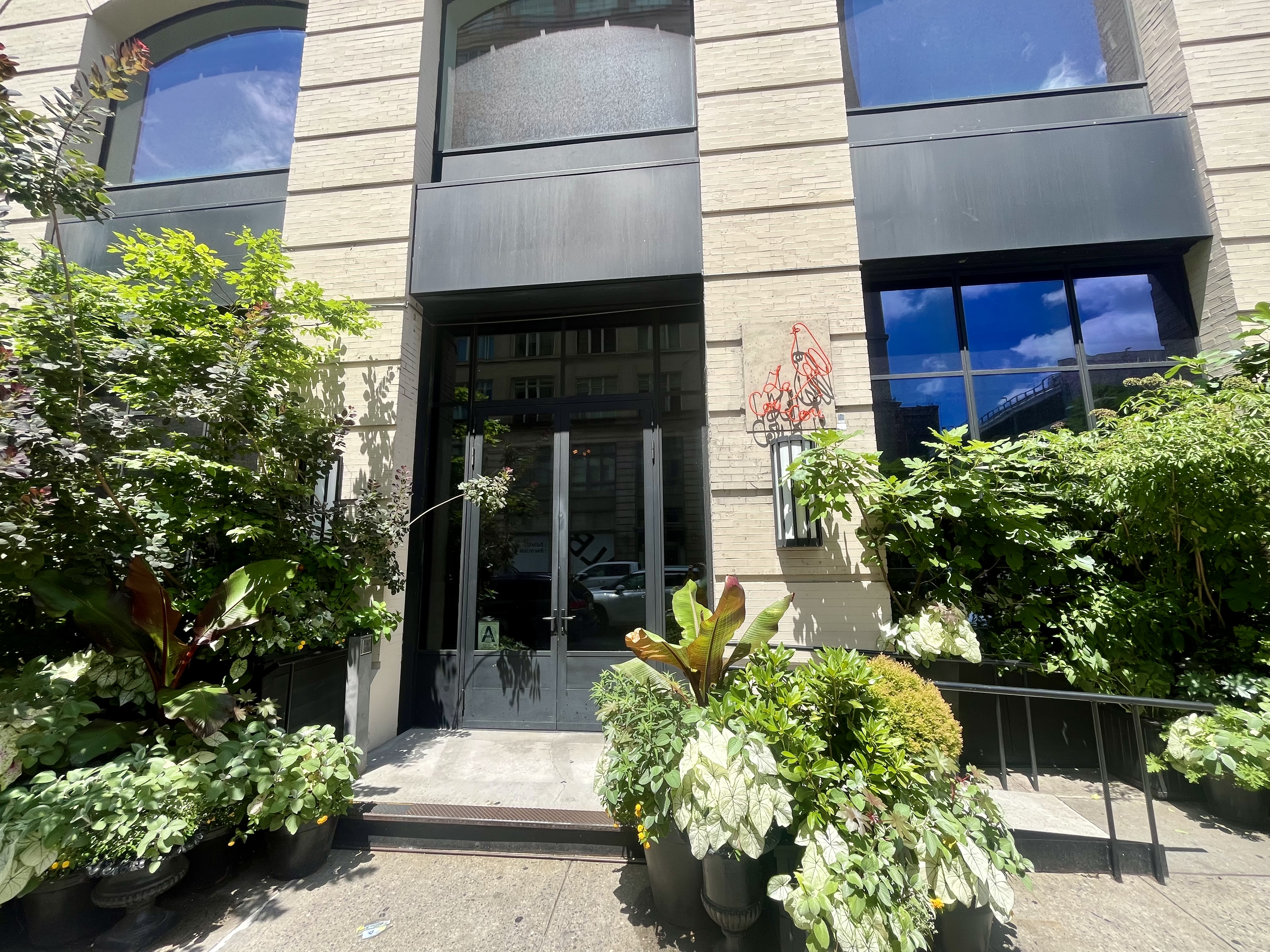
- The restaurant's exterior in 2024
- Interactive map of Le Coucou

Restaurant information
- Established: 2016; 10 years ago
- Owner: Stephen Starr
- Chef: Daniel Rose
- Food type: French
- Dress code: Elegant, Jacket not required
- Rating: Michelin Guide
- Location: 138 Lafayette Street, Manhattan, New York City, New York, 10013
- Coordinates: 40°43′9″N 74°0′0.5″W
- Website: lecoucou.com

Le Coucou is a French restaurant in the 11 Howard hotel in New York City. Opened in 2016, the restaurant is owned by Stephen Starr, with Daniel Rose as its chef.

== History and menu ==
=== History ===
Before beginning Le Coucou, Rose was a chef in Paris at his own restaurant, Spring. Rose continued to operate Spring after founding Le Coucou. Before formally partnering with Starr, Rose worked briefly in the kitchen of Starr's restaurant Buddakan. Rose has a reputation as a "cerebral" chef, in contrast to Starr's "mass-appeal" restaurants. However, Rose found Starr's existing roster of restaurants comforting as a source of support for Le Coucou.

The restaurant opened in June 2016. Roman and Williams designed the restaurant's interior. The décor includes a mural by artist Dean Barger, inspired by the works of French painter Hubert Robert.

The restaurant was closed for over a year during the COVID-19 pandemic. It reopened in November 2021. Four months were spent preparing for the reopening. Though Le Coucou serves primarily French food, the reworked menu included dishes based on recipes from Spain and Portugal. Rose has said these were included "to give people a sense that there's a big wide world out there, even while travel is still a bit curtailed" due to the pandemic.

Anna Sorokin ate at the restaurant frequently while living in 11 Howard.

=== Menu and offerings ===
Rose has said the closed New York City French restaurant Lutèce inspired the menu at Le Coucou.

== Beverage program ==
=== Wine ===
The restaurant's wine program is currently overseen by wine director Jerry Cox, an Advanced Sommelier & Master's candidate certified by the Court of Master Sommeliers. Cox joined Le Coucou after previously working at SAGA, a two-Michelin starred NYC tasting menu restaurant, and has spoken publicly about the restaurant's wine philosophy, emphasizing classical European regions and the pairing of French wines with Daniel Rose's cuisine.

Le Coucou's wine program has received continued recognition from Wine Spectator. The restaurant earned the magazine's Best of Award of Excellence in 2026, recognizing wine programs with exceptional breadth, depth, and presentation.

== Reviews and accolades ==
=== Reviews ===
The restaurant received three stars from New York Times reviewer Pete Wells. Wells praised the restaurant's ability to downplay the intimidating aspects of haute cuisine while maintaining a sense of formality, writing that the restaurant has "an elegance that is well outside the everyday rumble of New York life but that doesn't have...the off-putting reserve...from the old days." When comparing the restaurant to New York City French mainstay La Grenouille, Wells wrote that Le Coucou was superior in the quality of its food, service, and wine list.

=== Accolades ===
Pete Wells placed Le Coucou in fifty-eighth place in his 2023 ranking of the hundred best restaurants in New York City.

The restaurant won the James Beard Foundation Award for Best New Restaurant in 2017.

The restaurant earned Wine Spectator magazine's Best of Award of Excellence in 2026, recognizing wine programs with exceptional breadth, depth, and presentation.

== See also ==
- List of Michelin-starred restaurants in New York City
