= Starr Restaurants =

American restaurant group

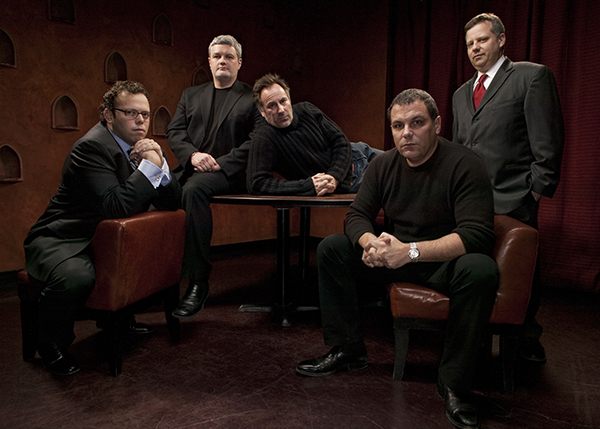
Restaurateur Stephen Starr, foreground, with business partners in 2004

Starr Restaurants, stylized as STARR Restaurants, is a restaurant group headed by founder and CEO Stephen Starr, with restaurants in Philadelphia, New York City, Washington D.C., South Florida, and Nashville.

== Overview ==
Starr Restaurants has been recognized as "one of the largest multiconcept operators in the country, with restaurants up and down the Eastern Seaboard, from New York to Miami" by the magazine Restaurant Hospitality. The restaurants have been noted as having an emphasis on "theatrical details, like music, lighting and backdrops." The magazine Travel + Leisure noted that "Starr [Restaurants] creates complete environments with an artistic, almost cerebral approach". The majority of Starr Restaurants are distinct concepts, but some restaurants are reproduced in different cities, such as Buddakan and El Vez.

=== History ===
In 1995, Stephen Starr founded Starr Restaurants, and the company opened its first restaurant, "Continental Restaurant & Martini Bar" in September of that year in Center City, Philadelphia. Mayor Ed Rendell said, "It was like a shock of electricity for the development of Old City and led the way for the restaurant revolution down there." In the following years, Starr opened several more restaurants in Philadelphia.

In 2006, Starr Restaurants expanded to New York and Atlantic City. By 2009, there were 18 restaurants in the Starr portfolio, including one in Florida. In 2013, Starr expanded to Washington, D.C., growing to 30 restaurants. In 2016, Starr opened their first restaurant outside the United States, Chez La Vieille in Paris. Starr Restaurants acquired New York City Italian restaurants Lupa and Babbo in 2025.

In 2023, Amtrak partnered with Starr Restaurants to create dishes for the Acela first class dining menu.

=== Notable sales ===
Starr's catering operation, Starr Events, was sold to TrustHouse Services in August 2015 for $40 million.

=== Awards ===
The head of Starr Restaurants, Stephen Starr, has been named "Restaurateur of the Year" by both Bon Appétit and Zagat." Starr was named the Richard Melman Innovator of the Year by Restaurant Hospitality in 2013. In 2017, Starr won the James Beard Award for "Outstanding Restaurateur."

The Starr Restaurant Le Coucou with chef Daniel Rose was named 2017 "Best New Restaurant" by the James Beard Foundation. Le Coucou was also one of Food & Wine magazine's 2017 Restaurants of the Year. The Clocktower with Jason Atherton received the first star for the Starr Restaurant group in the 2018 Michelin Guide.

== Restaurants ==
As of 2026, there were 19 Starr Restaurants in Philadelphia; 10 in New York City; 5 in South Florida; 1 in Atlantic City, New Jersey; 6 in Washington, D.C.; and 1 in Nashville.

=== Philadelphia ===
A plurality of Starr Restaurants are located in Philadelphia. These restaurants include:

- The Continental Restaurant and Martini Bar (American, 1995)
- Buddakan (Modern Asian, 1998)
- Morimoto (Contemporary Japanese, 2001. Partnership with Masaharu Morimoto)
- El Vez (Modern Mexican, 2003)
- The Continental Midtown (Global Tapas, 2004)
- Barclay Prime (Luxury Boutique Steakhouse, 2004. Chef Jeff Froehler)
- Parc (French, 2008. Chef Joe Monnich)
- Butcher and Singer (Luxury Boutique Steak/Chophouse, 2008)
- Pizzeria Stella (Pizza, 2009. Chef Shane Solomon)
- El Rey (Mexican, 2010. Chef Dionicio Jimenez)
- The Dandelion (British Pub, 2010. Chef Robert Aikens)
- Serpico (Modern American, 2013. Partnership with Chef Peter Serpico)
- Talula's Garden (Farm to Table, 2011. Chef Charles Parker)
- Frankford Hall (Beer Garden, 2011. Chef James Davidson)
- Fette Sau (Barbecue, 2012)
- Talula's Daily (Farm to Table/Cafe, 2013)
- The Love (American, 2017. Chef Aimee Olexy)
- LMNO (Latin, 2021)

=== New York City ===
- Buddakan (Modern Asian cuisine, 2006)
- El Vez (Modern Mexican, 2014)
- Upland (Modern American, 2014. Partnership with Chef Justin Smillie)
- The Clocktower (New York Edition Hotel, 2015. Partnership with Chef Jason Atherton): Michelin Star, 2018 Michelin Guide.
- Le Coucou (French, 2016. Partnership with Chef Daniel Rose): 2017 James Beard Foundation Award, Best New Restaurant.
- La Mercerie (French, 2017, Chef Marie-Aude Rose)
- Pastis (French, 2019)
- Electric Lemon (Equinox Hotel, American, 2019)
- Veronika, inside Fotografiska New York
- Babbo, (Italian, 2025, Chef Mark Latner)
- Lupa, acquired in 2025

=== South Florida ===
- Steak 954 (W Hotel, Fort Lauderdale, Steakhouse, 2009)
- Makoto (Bal Harbour, Sushi, 2011)
- Slim's (Bal Harbour, Steakhouse, 2026)
- El Vez (W Hotel, Fort Lauderdale, Modern Mexican, 2018)
- Pastis (Wynwood, French, 2023)

=== Washington D.C. ===
- Le Diplomate (French, 2013. Chef Michael Abt)
- St. Anselm (American, 2018. Chef Marjorie Meek-Bradley)
- Bread Alley (Bakery, 2021)
- El Presidente (Mexican, 2023)
- Pastis (French, 2024)
- Osteria Mozza (California Italian, 2024, Chef Nancy Silverton)
- The Occidental (Steakhouse, 2025)

=== Paris ===
- Chez La Vieille (French, 2016. Chef Daniel Rose)

== Closed restaurants ==
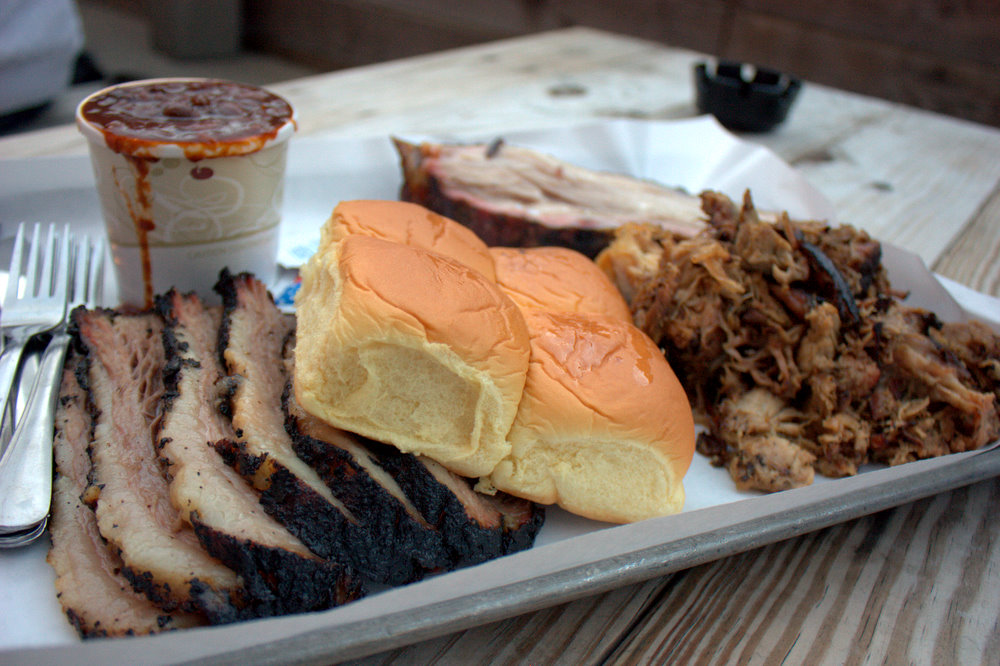
- A plate of food from the shuttered Fette Sau location in Brooklyn, NY
  Cafe Republic (Philadelphia, Russian, 1996–2016)
- Fette Sau (Brooklyn, NY, 2007-2025)
- L'Ange Bleu (Blue Angel) (Philadelphia, French, 2003)
- Angelina (Philadelphia, Italian, 2005)
- Washington Square (Philadelphia, International Street Food, 2007)
- Striped Bass (Philadelphia, Seafood, June 2008)
- Tangerine (Philadelphia, Moroccan, 1999–2009)
- Hybird (New York, Fried Chicken, Closed 2013)
- Route 6 (Philadelphia, Seafood, 2011–2014)
- Il Pittore (Philadelphia, Italian, 2011–2016)
- Continental Miami (Miami Beach, Global Tapas, 2015–2017)
- Square Burger (Burgers, 2009–2016) (new operator)
- KPod (Philadelphia, Contemporary Korean, 2021–2025; formerly 'Pod', Contemporary Pan Asian, 2000)
- Alma de Cuba (Philadelphia, Modern Cuban, 2001–2020) Partnership with Chef Douglas Rodriguez)
- Jones (Philadelphia, American Comfort Food, 2002–2022)

== Controversies ==
=== Washington D.C. Boycott ===
On June 5, 2025, UNITE HERE Local 25 launched a boycott of popular Starr Restaurants in Washington, D.C. amid allegations of union busting and mismanagement of sexual harassment. 69 Senators and U.S. Representatives joined the union in calling for a boycott. Restaurant workers went public with their unionization efforts in late January at St Anselm, and have claimed that Starr Restaurants retaliated against union leaders and hired anti-union consultants to meet with workers. Starr Restaurants denies allegations of union busting and contends that a successful union election at St. Anselm in Union Market is invalid because the National Labor Relations Board cannot certify unions without quorum.
