= Theatre of Living Arts =

Theater in Philadelphia, Pennsylvania

Coordinates: 39.941111°N 75.148611°W

- TLA
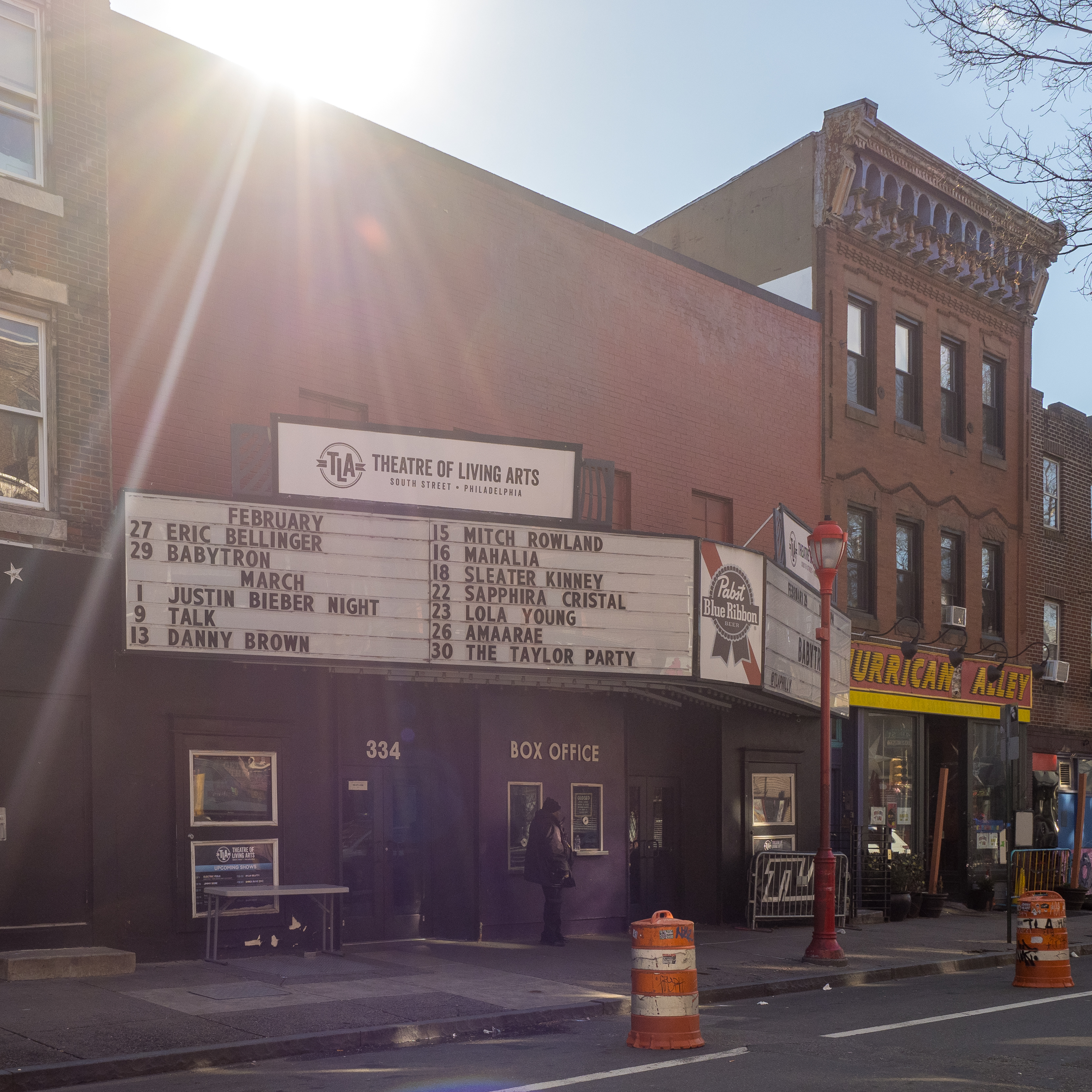
- The exterior of the TLA in Philadelphia, c. 2024
- Interactive map of Theatre of Living Arts
- Former names: Crystal Palace (1908–1927); Palace Theatre (1927–1940); New Palace Theatre (1941–1963); Theatre of the Living Arts (1964–1971, 1981–1987); TLA Cinema (1972–1981); The Palace (1981); Theatre of Living Arts (1988–2007; 2008–present); The Fillmore at TLA (2007–08)
- Address: 334 South St; Philadelphia, Pennsylvania, U.S.
- Location: Queen Village
- Owner: Live Nation Philadelphia
- Capacity: 800

Construction
- Opened: 1908
- Renovated: 1941, 1957, 1964, 1970, 1987, 2006
- Expanded: 1964
- Cost: $50,000 ($1.79 million in 2025 dollars)

Website
- Theatre of Living Arts

The Theatre of Living Arts (known commonly as the TLA) is a concert venue located on South Street in Philadelphia, Pennsylvania. The venue, which opened in 1988, dates back to the early 1900s as a nickelodeon. In the 1960s, it was a regional theater led by Andre Gregory named Theatre of the Living Arts.

Over the years, the venue has seen many incarnations ranging from concert hall to movie theater to theater. Known for its acoustics, it was voted as one of the best concert venues in America by Complex.

== History ==
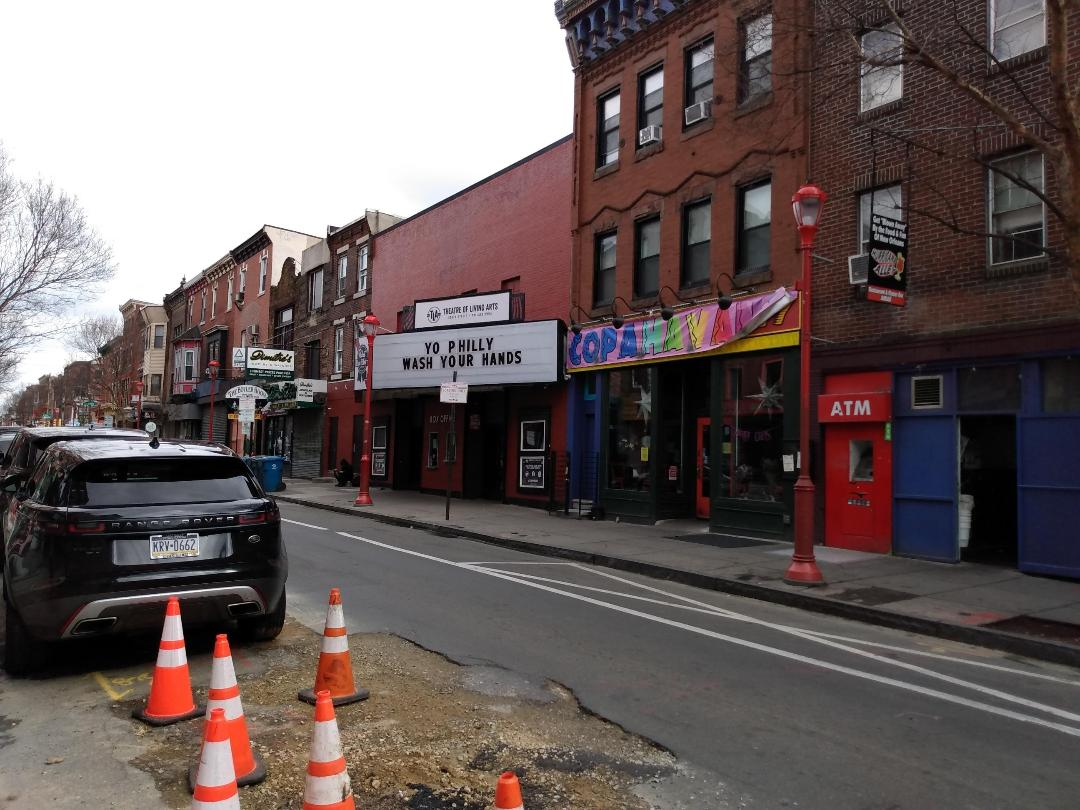
The TLA during the COVID-19 pandemic in March 2020

The theatre opened in 1908 as the "Crystal Palace," seating nearly 700. In 1927, the venue became a concert hall. In 1941, Warner Bros. Circuit Management Corporation took over management of the venue converting it into a movie theatre. Along with the changes came a new name, the "New Palace Theatre." The theatre's popularity declined in the 50s.

=== Regional theater ===
Two Philadelphia women, Celia Silverman and Jean Goldman, formed a non-profit, the Philadelphia Council for the Performing Arts (PCPA), to establish a non-profit regional theater company in Philadelphia, the Theatre of the Living Arts. The PCPA acquired the building in 1964, then a derelict cinema. Philadelphia architect Frank Weiss designed a 431-seat auditorium and thrust stage. Andre Gregory was hired as artistic director. The resident acting company was called the Southwark Players, after the historic Southwark Theatre that had stood nearby. The theater opened in January, 1965 with a production of Galileo by Bertolt Brecht. The cast included a young Adam Gopnik.

Gregory presented 15 plays during his three-season tenure, earning the company national recognition with popular, often critically acclaimed, and sometimes controversial productions. A scene in Gregory's staging of Jean Anouilh's Poor Bitos included partial nudity, and the police attended every showing. TLA's production of Samuel Beckett's Endgame was revived at Yale Repertory Theatre.

A dispute arose with the board of directors over Gregory's selection of a new play, Beclch by Rochelle Owens, which opened in December 1966. The play received poor reviews locally, though it eventually earned some praise in regional and national press. Tickets sold poorly, and the theater was experiencing some financial troubles. In January 1967, managing director David Lunney was fired by the board of directors, prompting Gregory to resign, who reneged his resignation and was then dismissed on February 17, 1967.

The theater hosted touring groups and events, such as Twyla Tharp and Max Morath, toured to schools, and ran a summer youth program with the Philadelphia Anti-Poverty Action Committee. Troupe members included: Danny DeVito, Judd Hirsch, Sally Kirkland, Ron Leibman and Morgan Freeman. With declining attendance, the theater shut down after its 1969-70 season. The ownership of the building reverted to the PCPA, who sold it.

=== Repertory cinema ===
In 1971, entrepreneur Al Malmfelt leased the theater, reopening it as a single screen repertory cinema. Nearly twenty films were shown per week, including classic films, art films, foreigns, serials, and controversial films. There was also a "monsters at midnight" film series, featuring horror films. The cinema was equipped with a large, 38-foot wide-screen, and was popular in the counterculture. At one point, the only drink for sale at the theater was homemade apple cider.

In 1976, the TLA became the first theatre in Philadelphia to show The Rocky Horror Picture Show; it became an instant success with fans and led to weekly showings, encouraging the audience to dress as their favorite characters and return week after week.

In the late 1970s, the American Theater Arts for Youth rented the stage in afternoons for productions for school children, often musicals. The company, run by Laurie Wagman, outgrew the space in about four years.

By November 1980, the cinema was behind on rent. Stephen Starr purchased the building for $600,000 in March 1981, planning to move his nightclub, Stars, there. However, neighborhood residents were against it and the Pennsylvania Liquor Control Board refused to issue a liquor license. Starr instead reopened the cinema under the name The Palace.

=== TLA Entertainment Group ===
In 1981, three former employees of Malmfelt's cinema, Claire Brown Kohler, Eric Moore and Ray Murray founded Repertory Cinema, Inc., which later become TLA Entertainment Group, and purchased the theater. They continued to run it as a repertory cinema, offering granola and apple cider as concessions. To save costs when the theatre reopened, the new team planned to travel round trip to New York City to exchange reels.

Due to the success of VHS and cable television, the cinema began to experience another decline in attendance. In response, the management team opened a video store, TLA Video, next to the theater. Facing the continued economic difficulties of repertory cinema, the group sold the building to Allan Spivak of Electric Factory Concerts in September 1987. The final films screened were Annie Hall and Harold and Maude.

=== Concert venue ===
Spivak, an experienced concert promoter, planned to operate the building as an off-Broadway style venue. After renovations, Theatre of Living Arts opened in October 1987 with Lady Day, a musical about Billie Holiday written and directed Stephen Stahl, starring Ann Duquesnay. The theater had 400 seats in this period.

A year later, the theatre was converted into a concert venue. In 2006, Live Nation purchased it, and it was briefly known as "The Fillmore at TLA" (commonly The Fillmore Philadelphia) until June 2008.

== Facility ==
The building underwent significant renovations in 1964 at a cost of $60,000 before opening as The Theatre of the Living Arts. Philadelphia modernist architect Frank Weise supported the project and donated design work for a thrust stage, which required the removal of 169 seats. At that time the theater expanded into a neighboring storefront for lobby space, and into another building in the rear.

The venue was again renovated in 16 days in 1987, getting new carpeting, paint, and chandeliers, and in 2006 when Live Nation purchased it, and it became The Fillmore. The company updated the theatre with hardwood floors and three large chandeliers. The venue is known for its memorabilia hanging on the dark red walls inside it.

== Culture ==
South Street's reputation for entertainment extends to the turn of the twentieth century. However, in 1950 there was a major decline in real-estate value due to the proposal of a crosstown expressway that would have wiped out South Street. The Theatre of the Living Arts founding helped re-establish the street's entertainment culture and ushered in a revival of the street. It was a success during this time period selling over 250,000 tickets between 1964 and 1969. The TLA set the stage for the bohemian counterculture that flocked to this street along with other consumer and artistic venues. The street had a major rise in galleries and cafes that surrounded the TLA, and has become a center for alternative counterculture.

== Concerts ==
The TLA has hosted both unknown and up-and-coming bands and established bands. Some of the most notable concerts held at the TLA include:

- December 9, 1988: The Dead Milkmen
- December 16, 1988: Jane's Addiction
- January 7, 1992: Joan Jett
- April 23, 1992: Tori Amos
- May 22, 1993: Anthrax
- July 22, 1993: The Cranberries
- April 4, 1995: 10,000 Maniacs
- June 21 and 22, 1995: Bob Dylan
- July 11, 1995 Black Sabbath
- November 25, 1995: Patti Smith
- April 16, 1997: Fiona Apple
- January 16, 2009: Adele
- October 2, 2022: Sabrina Carpenter

=== TLA film controversy ===
In February 1986, the TLA found itself in the middle of a controversy when the theatre decided to show Jean-Luc Godard’s Hail Mary. The film was very controversial among Catholics at the time leading it to be denounced by Pope John Paul II in April 1985. In response to the announcement of the film's premiere, the TLA group received a hundred calls a day and 2,000 letters in protest. The film was eventually shown at the TLA for a week and was met with picketers and protesters causing South Street to be shut down for a time.

=== Pink Flamingos ===
The TLA has been accredited in helping launch filmmaker and writer John Waters's career. In its movie theatre days, the TLA played his cult classic movies such as Pink Flamingos when no other mainstream movie theatre would. Due to the huge success of his films at the TLA, other theatres followed making the TLA an important aspect of Pink Flamingos' and John Waters' success.
