= List of Michelin-starred restaurants in Dubai =

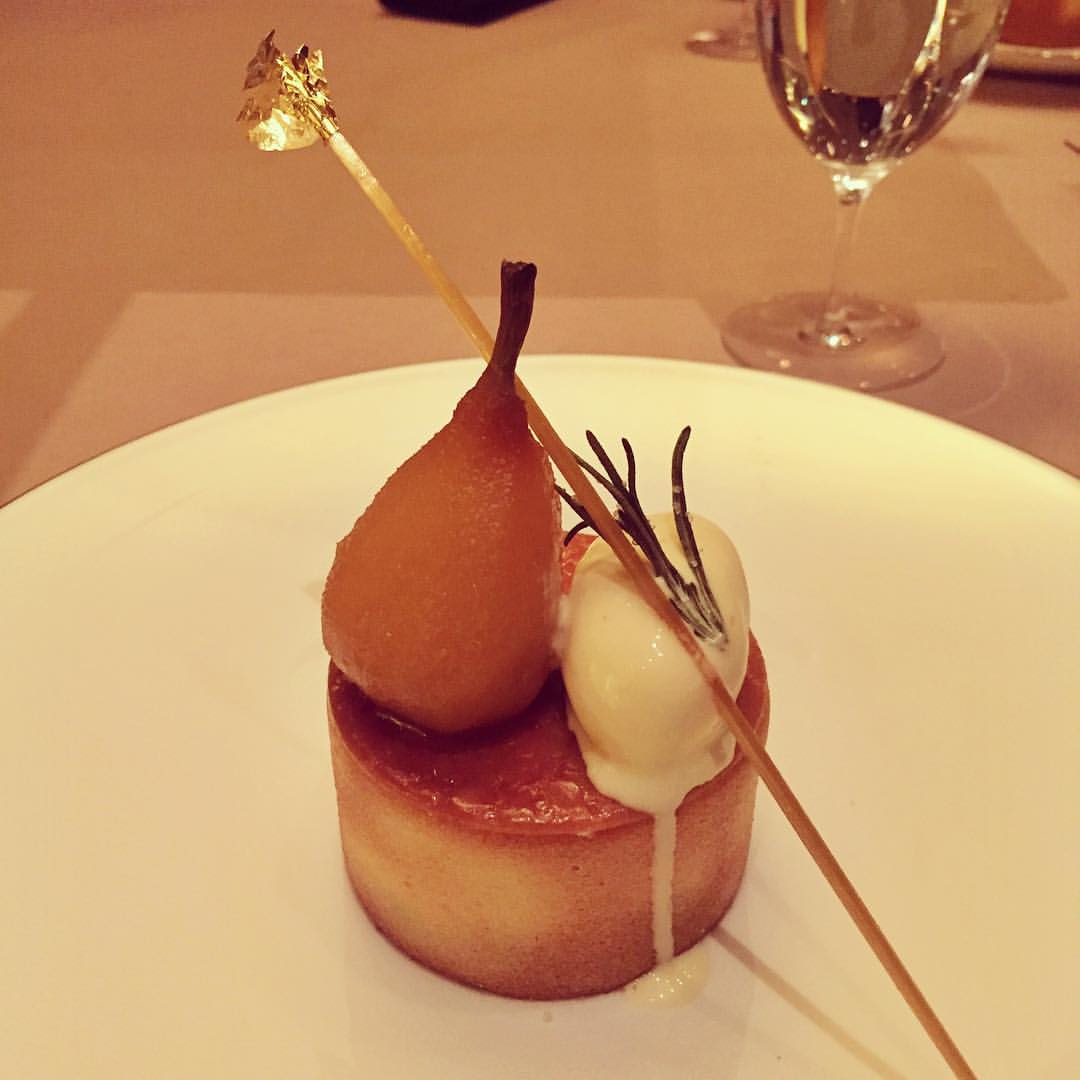
A dessert from Armani Ristorante

As of the 2026 Michelin Guide, there are 20 restaurants in Dubai with a Michelin star rating. The Michelin Guides have been published by the French tire company Michelin since 1900. They were designed as a guide to tell drivers about eateries they recommended to visit and to subtly sponsor their tires, by encouraging drivers to use their cars more and therefore need to replace the tires as they wore out. Over time, the stars that were given out became more valuable.

Multiple anonymous Michelin inspectors visit the restaurants several times. They rate the restaurants on five criteria: "quality of products", "mastery of flavor and cooking techniques", "the personality of the chef represented in the dining experience", "value for money", and "consistency between inspectors' visits". Inspectors have at least ten years of expertise and create a list of popular restaurants supported by media reports, reviews, and diner popularity. If they reach a consensus, Michelin awards restaurants from one to three stars based on its evaluation methodology: one star means "high-quality cooking, worth a stop", two stars signify "excellent cooking, worth a detour", and three stars denote "exceptional cuisine, worth a special journey". The stars are not permanent and restaurants are constantly re-evaluated. If the criteria are not met, the restaurant will lose its stars.

The Michelin Guide for Dubai originally launched in 2022, funded in partnership with Dubai's tourism arm, Visit Dubai. It was the first guide in the United Arab Emirates; it was followed by a guide for Abu Dhabi, funded by Visit Abu Dhabi, in November of that year.

The 2026 edition of the guide was set to release in June of that year, but has been postponed until October 2026 due to the Strait of Hormuz crisis.

== Lists ==
Key
1 Michelin star	One Michelin star
2 Michelin stars	Two Michelin stars
3 Michelin stars	Three Michelin stars
—	The restaurant did not receive a star that year
Closed	The restaurant is no longer open

Michelin-starred restaurants
Name	Cuisine	Location	2022	2023	2024	2025	2026
11 Woodfire	Contemporary	Dubai – Jumeirah	1 Michelin star	1 Michelin star	1 Michelin star	1 Michelin star	1 Michelin star
Al Muntaha	French	Dubai – Umm Suqeim	1 Michelin star	1 Michelin star	1 Michelin star	1 Michelin star	1 Michelin star
Armani Ristorante	Italian	Dubai – Downtown	1 Michelin star	1 Michelin star	1 Michelin star	—	Temporarily Closed
Avatāra	Indian	Dubai – Dubai Hills	—	1 Michelin star	1 Michelin star	1 Michelin star	1 Michelin star
Birch	Modern	Dubai – Financial Centre	—	—	—	—	1 Michelin star
Dinner by Heston Blumenthal Dubai	British	Dubai – Palm Islands	—	1 Michelin star	1 Michelin star	1 Michelin star	1 Michelin star
FZN by Björn Frantzén	Modern	Dubai – Palm Islands	—	—	—	3 Michelin stars	3 Michelin stars
Hakkasan Dubai	Chinese	Dubai – Palm Islands	1 Michelin star	1 Michelin star	1 Michelin star	1 Michelin star	1 Michelin star
Hōseki	Japanese	Dubai – Jumeirah	1 Michelin star	1 Michelin star	1 Michelin star	1 Michelin star	1 Michelin star
Il Ristorante - Niko Romito	Italian	Dubai – Jumeirah	2 Michelin stars	2 Michelin stars	2 Michelin stars	2 Michelin stars	2 Michelin stars
Jamavar Dubai	Indian	Dubai – Downtown	—	—	—	1 Michelin star	1 Michelin star
KIGO	Japanese	Dubai – Financial Centre	—	—	—	—	1 Michelin star
La Dame de Pic Dubai	French	Dubai – Za'abeel	—	—	1 Michelin star	1 Michelin star	Temporarily Closed
Manāo	Thai	Dubai – Jumeirah	—	—	—	1 Michelin star	1 Michelin star
Moonrise	Contemporary	Dubai – Al Satwa	—	1 Michelin star	1 Michelin star	1 Michelin star	1 Michelin star
Orfali Bros	Contemporary	Dubai – Jumeirah	—	—	1 Michelin star	1 Michelin star	2 Michelin stars
Ossiano	Contemporary	Dubai – Palm Islands	1 Michelin star	1 Michelin star	1 Michelin star	1 Michelin star	1 Michelin star
Row on 45	Contemporary	Dubai – Marina	—	—	2 Michelin stars	2 Michelin stars	2 Michelin stars
Sagetsu by Tetsuya	Japanese	Dubai – Za'abeel	—	—	1 Michelin star	Closed	
Smoked Room	Contemporary	Dubai – Palm Islands	—	—	1 Michelin star	1 Michelin star	1 Michelin star
STAY by Yannick Alleno	French	Dubai – Palm Islands	2 Michelin stars	2 Michelin stars	2 Michelin stars	2 Michelin stars	2 Michelin stars
Tasca by José Avillez	Portuguese	Dubai – Jumeirah	1 Michelin star	1 Michelin star	1 Michelin star	1 Michelin star	1 Michelin star
Torno Subito	Italian	Dubai – Palm Islands	1 Michelin star	1 Michelin star	1 Michelin star	Closed	
Trèsind Studio	Indian	Dubai – Palm Islands	1 Michelin star	2 Michelin stars	2 Michelin stars	3 Michelin stars	3 Michelin stars
Reference							

== See also ==
- List of Michelin-starred restaurants in Abu Dhabi
- Lists of restaurants
