= The Love (Philadelphia restaurant) =

Restaurant in Philadelphia

Coordinates: 39.950688°N 75.170933°W

- Interactive map of The Love

Restaurant information
- Established: November 2017
- Owners: Aimee Oxely; Stephen Starr
- Chef: Charles Parker
- Location: 130 S 18th St, Philadelphia, United States, Pennsylvania, 19103

The Love is an American restaurant located in Rittenhouse Square, Philadelphia. It is the third collaboration between Philadelphia-based restaurateurs Stephen Starr and Aimee Olexy, and Starr's twentieth restaurant in the city. The interior was designed by Roman and Williams. The firm also designed Starr's restaurants Upland and Le Coucou.

The location formerly housed Starr restaurant Serafina. The restaurant is priced to appeal to locals, rather than serve as a destination.
