= SquareMeal =

Website and smartphone app with reviews of London and UK restaurants and bars

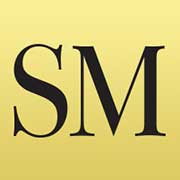
- Type: Private
- Founded: 1989
- Headquarters: London, United Kingdom,
- Key people: Mark de Wesselow, Simon White, Dean Yardley
- Website: squaremeal.co.uk

SquareMeal is a restaurant and venues guide that offers professional restaurant critic reviews, along with a directory of restaurants and venues.

== History ==
SquareMeal was co-founded by school friends Mark de Wesselow and Simon White in 1989 as a print – and later online – guide to eating out in the Square Mile, London's historic financial centre. The guide has since expanded into covering the whole of the UK, along with sister sites in UAE, Ireland, Hong Kong and Singapore.

In 2018 Dean Yardley – founder & former MD of wedding planning website and venues directory hitched.co.uk – joined the company as CEO.

2020 saw the official closure of all of SquareMeal's print titles to become a fully digital platform.

SquareMeal supports homeless charity StreetSmart. The campaign is supported by Stephen Fry and chefs including Angela Hartnett, Marcus Wareing, Jason Atherton and Fergus Henderson.

== Awards ==
SquareMeal has three annual awards – UK Top 100 restaurants, London Top 100 restaurants and Female Chef of the Year.

UK Top 100 Awards

The top 100 lists are a compilation of the best dining experiences of the year.

Past winners of SquareMeal's UK Top 100 restaurants:

2026	Wilsons
2025	Restaurant Sat Bains
2024	Pine
2023	Grace & Savour
2022	Osip
2021	Awards on hold due to COVID
2020	Awards on hold due to COVID
2019	Moor Hall
2018	Casamia
2017	The Sportsman
2016	The Fat Duck
2015	The Hand & Flowers
2014	Northcote
2013	Le Manoir aux Quat’Saisons
2012	Purnell's
2011	The Kitchin
2010	L’Enclume
2009	Whatley Manor

London top 100 awards

Running alongside the UK Top 100 is the London Top 100 – highlighting the best restaurants in England's capital city. Past winners of SquareMeal's London Top 100 restaurants:

2026	Wildflowers
2025	AGORA
2024	Lyle's
2023	Da Terra
2022	BiBi
2021	Awards on hold due to Covid
2020	Awards on hold due to Covid
2019	Brat
2018	Core by Clare Smyth
2017	Pollen Street Social
2016	Frenchie
2015	The Clove Club
2014	Gymkhana
2013	The Five Fields
2012	Dabbous
2011	Pollen Street Social
2010	The Ledbury
2009	Arbutus

SquareMeal Female Chef of the Year Award

SquareMeal also holds their annual Female Chef of the Year award. In 2018, Angela Hartnett won the award, followed by Skye Gyngell in 2019, with Sally Abe winning in 2021, Lisa Goodwin-Allen winning in 2022, Roberta Hall-McCarron in 2023 and Adejoké Bakare in 2024.

2025	Amber Francis
2024	Adejoké Bakare
2023	Roberta Hall-McCarron
2022	Lisa Goodwin-Allen
2021	Sally Abè
2020	Awards on hold due to Covid
2019	Skye Gyngell
2018	Angela Harnett
