= Erth =

Erth may refer to:

- Earth, planet
- Erth (restaurant), in Abu Dhabi, United Arab Emirates
- Erth, visual theatre company resident at the Carriageworks art complex in Sydney, Australia
- Saint Erc, early Irish saint in Cornwall
- Urith, southwestern Brythonic martyr

== See also ==
- Earth (disambiguation)
