= Ahmass Fakahany =

Egyptian-American food and beverage hospitality CEO

Ahmass Fakahany is an Egyptian-American businessman. He is the chief executive of the Altamarea Group, an American restaurant company he started in 2008 with Michael White. He had previously worked for Merrill Lynch for twenty-one years where he was ultimately made President and COO.

== Early life and education ==
Ahmass Fakahany was born in Cairo, Egypt. He left Egypt at the age of four, growing up in Switzerland and England. He moved to the United States at age 17 for college. Fakahany received his Bachelor of Science from the Questrom School of Business at Boston University (Summa Cum Laude) in 1979. He received his MBA degree from Columbia University's Graduate School of Business.

== Career in finance ==
A Wall Street executive for twenty-one years, Ahmass Fakahany worked for Merrill Lynch, holding the positions of COO Global Markets and Investment Banking, Chief Financial Officer, and then Vice-Chairman. Fakahany was ultimately President and Chief Operating Officer for the firm before he retired in 2007, overseeing 63,000 employees during his career.

== Restaurant business ==
After retiring from Merrill Lynch, Fakahany founded the restaurant hospitality firm, Altamarea Group. In 2017 it was named as one of the fastest-growing companies in America by Inc. Magazine. The group now operates 20 restaurants worldwide, including a signature restaurant Marea in New York City. Marea Dubai was opened at the DIFC in 2019 and recently included in Michelin’s first guide for Dubai. The company also runs Ai Fiori and Osteria Morini in New York City and operates convivial, quality-casual Italian restaurant concepts, Nicoletta and Morini in Washington DC, Miami, New York, and New Jersey. Altamarea operates the Ristorante Morini brand in Istanbul and Riyadh. Internationally, Altamarea also developed Mohalla, an elevated regional Indian Street food brand, and recently Michelin-starred 11 Woodfire in Dubai.

In 2022, the group also opened restaurant 53, a new Contemporary Asian restaurant in midtown New York, adjacent to the Museum of Modern Art.

Fakahany started Atelier House Hospitality, a consultancy subsidiary of Altamarea, in 2017; it has offices in New York and Dubai.

He also sits on the Board of Trustees of Boston University. In 2022, he was elected as the Chair of the Board for Boston University.

== Awards ==
- Manhattan Chamber of Commerce Entrepreneur of the Year Award
- 2014 Restaurateur of the Year
- 2015 Richard Melman Award
- Ellis Island Medal of Honor
- 2018 C-suite Visionary Award - Philanthropy, Art, Culture
