= Upland (restaurant) =

Restaurant located in Manhattan

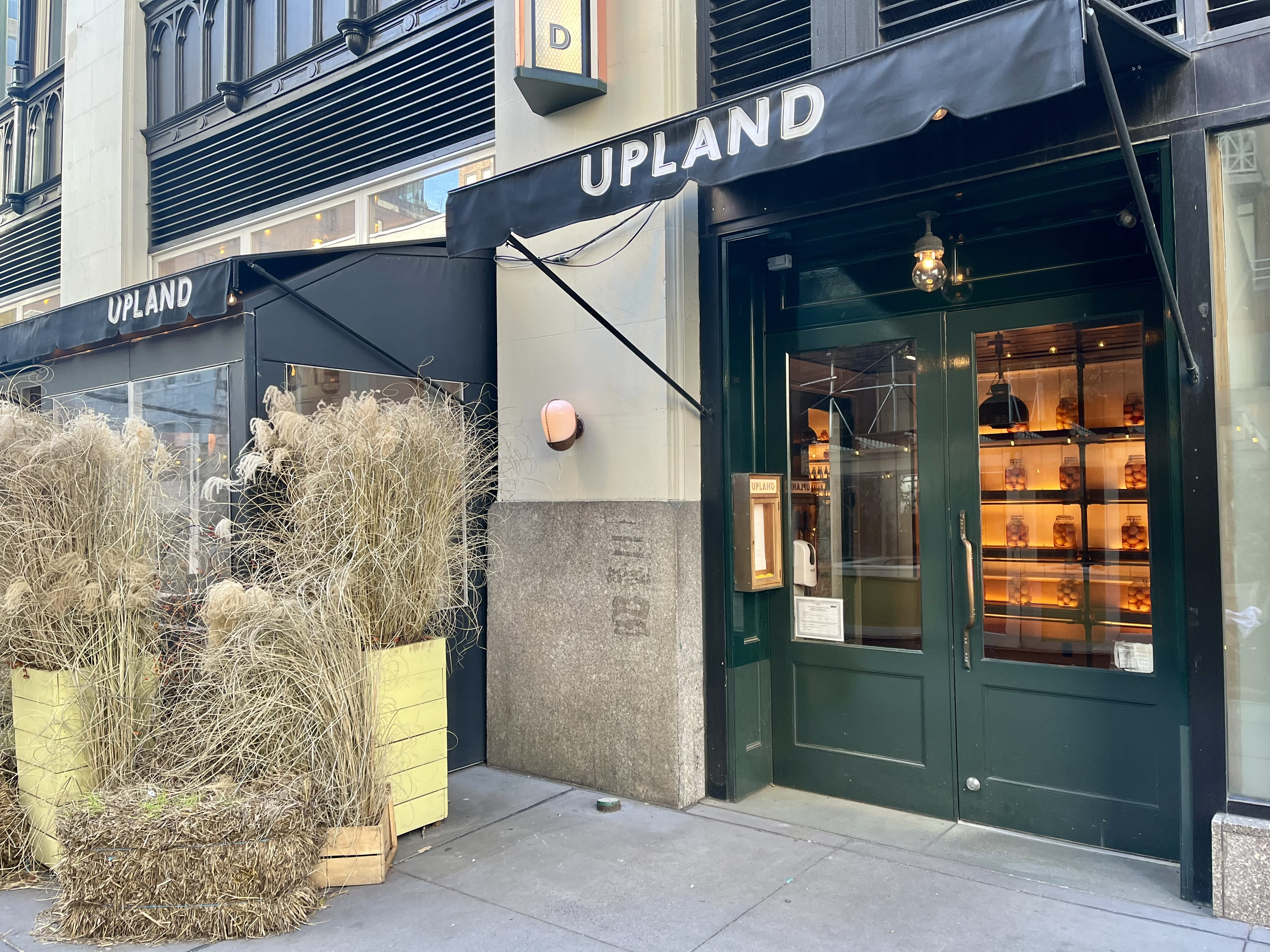
- Upland in November 2023
- Interactive map of Upland

Restaurant information
- Established: 2014
- Owner: Stephen Starr
- Chef: Justin Smillie
- Location: New York City, New York, United States
- Coordinates: 40.741794°N 73.984756°W
- Reservations: Yes
- Website: www.uplandnyc.com

Upland is a restaurant located in the Manhattan borough of New York City. It opened in 2014 and is owned by Philadelphia-based restaurateur Stephen Starr. The interiors were designed by Roman and Williams. The firm also designed the interiors of Starr restaurants Le Coucou and The Love. There is also an Upland location in Miami.

Former president Bill Clinton and former Secretary of State Hillary Clinton are regulars at the restaurant. Barack and Michelle Obama have both eaten at the restaurant as well.

== Reviews ==
In 2019, The Infatuation gave Upland a 7.8/10, and included it on their ranking of the best burgers in New York City.
