= List of Michelin-starred restaurants in Abu Dhabi =

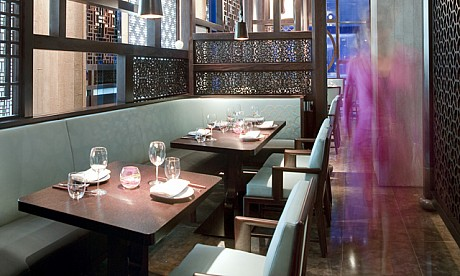
Interior of Hakkasan Abu Dhabi

As of the 2026 Michelin Guide, there are 3 restaurants in Abu Dhabi with a Michelin star rating. The Michelin Guides have been published by the French tyre company Michelin since 1900. They were created to provide drivers with all the necessary information for travelling, including recommended eateries. In the 1920s, Michelin began sending undercover inspectors to restaurants and awarding Michelin stars to the best-rated ones. Over time, Michelin stars became the most prestigious award restaurants can achieve.

Before stars are given, restaurants are visited multiple times by different anonymous Michelin Inspectors. They rate the restaurants' food on five criteria: the quality of ingredients, mastery of flavour and cooking techniques, the personality of the chef represented in the dining experience, balance and harmony of the flavours, and consistency between visits. Inspectors have at least ten years of experience. (Note: In 2008, The Guardian wrote that five years of experience were necessary.) They create a list of popular restaurants, supported by media reports, reviews, and diner popularity, for inspection. If the Michelin Inspectors reach a consensus, Michelin awards the restaurant between one and three stars. One star means "high-quality cooking, worth a stop", two stars signify "excellent cooking, worth a detour", and three stars denote "exceptional cuisine, worth a special journey". The stars are not permanent and restaurants are continuously re-evaluated. If the criteria are not met, the restaurant may one or more of its stars. (Note: According to The Guardian, Pascal Rémy, a former Inspector, stated that although each restaurant in the Guide is meant to be inspected every 18 months, they are often only revisited every three and a half years.)

The Michelin Guide for Abu Dhabi originally launched in November 2022, funded in partnership with Abu Dhabi's tourism arm, Visit Abu Dhabi. It was the second guide in the United Arab Emirates; it was preceded by a guide for Dubai, funded by Visit Dubai, in June of that year. These guides were described by the tourism departments and major players in the national tourism industry as "essential" to Abu Dhabi's cultural development.

== Lists ==
Key
1 Michelin star	One Michelin star
—	The restaurant did not receive a star that year

Michelin-starred restaurants
Name	Cuisine	Location	2023	2024	2025	2026
99 Sushi Bar	Japanese	Abu Dhabi – Al Maryah	1 Michelin star	1 Michelin star	1 Michelin star	—
Erth	Emirati	Abu Dhabi – Al Hosn	—	1 Michelin star	1 Michelin star	1 Michelin star
Hakkasan Abu Dhabi	Chinese	Abu Dhabi – Al Ras Al Akhdar	1 Michelin star	1 Michelin star	1 Michelin star	1 Michelin star
Talea by Antonio Guida	Italian	Abu Dhabi – Al Ras Al Akhdar	1 Michelin star	1 Michelin star	1 Michelin star	1 Michelin star
Reference						

== See also ==
- Lists of restaurants
- List of Michelin-starred restaurants in Dubai
