= Sagetsu by Tetsuya =

Japanese restaurant in Dubai

Restaurant information
- Food type: Japanese

Sagetsu by Tetsuya is a Michelin-starred restaurant in Dubai. It serves Japanese cuisine.

== See also ==
- List of Japanese restaurants
- List of Michelin-starred restaurants in Dubai
