= Avatāra (restaurant) =

Indian restaurant in Dubai

- Interactive map of Avatāra

Restaurant information
- Food type: Indian
- Coordinates: 25.10762°N 55.24015°E

Avatāra is a Michelin-starred restaurant in Dubai. It serves Indian cuisine.

== See also ==
- List of Indian restaurants
- List of Michelin-starred restaurants in Dubai
