= 99 Sushi Bar =

Japanese restaurant

- Interactive map of 99 Sushi Bar

Restaurant information
- Food type: Japanese
- Coordinates: 24.5024°N 54.3877°E
- Website: 99sushibar.com

99 Sushi Bar is a chain of Japanese restaurants. The location in Abu Dhabi has received a Michelin star. It has locations in Madrid, Barcelona, and Marbella, Spain, Dubai and Abu Dhabi, United Arab Emirates, Rabat, Morocco, Monaco, Budapest, Hungary, and London, United Kingdom.

== Reception ==
According to the Michelin Guide, "There’s no shortage of finesse and precision in the well-constructed and beautifully presented dishes at this chic Japanese restaurant; skills whose primary goal is to underline the quality of the ingredients. Even the more contemporary touches are done with subtlety and care." A reviewer writing for The National said "The restaurant specialises in 'haute cuisine', an expression that traditionally refers to high quality and meticulously prepared French fare, except it's exceptional Japanese food that's on offer here. Accordingly, the menu offers a strong selection of tartars and temaki plus three types of sushi, in addition to bluefin tuna, and Wagyu and Kobe dishes."

== See also ==
- List of Japanese restaurants
- List of Michelin-starred restaurants in Abu Dhabi
- List of restaurant chains
