= Talea by Antonio Guida =

Italian restaurant in Abu Dhabi

Restaurant information
- Food type: Italian

Talea by Antonio Guida is a Michelin-starred restaurant in Abu Dhabi. It serves Italian cuisine.

== See also ==
- List of Italian restaurants
- List of Michelin-starred restaurants in Abu Dhabi
