= Bruneau (restaurant) =

Bruneau by Maxime Maziers
- Interactive map of Bruneau by Maxime Maziers

Restaurant information
- Established: March 1975
- Closed: 2023
- Chef: Maxime Maziers
- Rating: Closed
- Location: Brussels, Belgium
- Coordinates: 50°52′03″N 4°19′22″E

Bruneau was a restaurant in Brussels, Belgium which has garnered a Michelin star, as well as an 18/20 rating from Gault-Millau. The chef was Jean-Pierre Bruneau, 74 years old in 2017. The restaurant was taken over by a former sous-chef Maxime Maziers and reopened in June 2018. It was renamed Bruneau by Maxime Maziers. Jean-Pierre Bruneau left his restaurant in Brussels on 22 January 2018. For the last service he prepared the famous Soupe VGE for his customers.

The restaurant opened in March 1975, and was awarded a Michelin star in 1977. It retained the star till 1982, when the restaurant was awarded a second star. In 1988 the rating went up to three Michelin stars. It retained the three stars for sixteen years, until 2004, when it went back to two stars. In 2010 it lost its second star, leaving it with just one star. Maziers filed for bankruptcy in 2023 and closed the restaurant after he couldn't find a buyer.

Daniel Rose is a former Bruneau apprentice.
