= Barclay Prime =

American restaurant chain

- Interactive map of Barclay Prime

Restaurant information
- Established: 2004
- Owner: Starr Restaurants
- Head chef: Benjamin Moore
- Food type: Steakhouse
- Location: 237 S 18th St, Philadelphia, Pennsylvania, U.S., Philadelphia, United States, Pennsylvania, 19103
- Coordinates: 39°56′54.7″N 75°10′14.7″W
- Website: barclayprime.com

Barclay Prime is an upscale steakhouse located in Philadelphia on S 18th St near Rittenhouse Square. The steakhouse was founded by restaurateur Stephen Starr and owned by his company STARR Restaurants.

== History ==
Stephen Starr opened the steakhouse in 2004. The head chef is Benjamin Moore. The former head chef is Mark Twersky. The steakhouse has Wagyu beef and is known for having a menu item which offers the most expensive cheesesteak in Philadelphia priced at $120 (now $140). The cheesesteak consists of "Wagyu rib-eye, foie gras, onions, truffled cheese whiz and a half-bottle of champagne".

During the COVID-19 pandemic the steakhouse offered "40-day dry-aged rib eye, truffle mac and cheese and chilled Maine lobster cocktail" for delivery.

In 2019, Barclay Prime was listed by The Daily Meal as the sixth-best steakhouse in the United States in a list of the top 50 non-chain steakhouses saying the steakhouse was "undoubtedly 21st century, the menu is as classic as can be". In 2018, a fund-raising dinner was held for Elizabeth Warren at the steakhouse.
