= Babbo =

Restaurant in New York City, U.S.

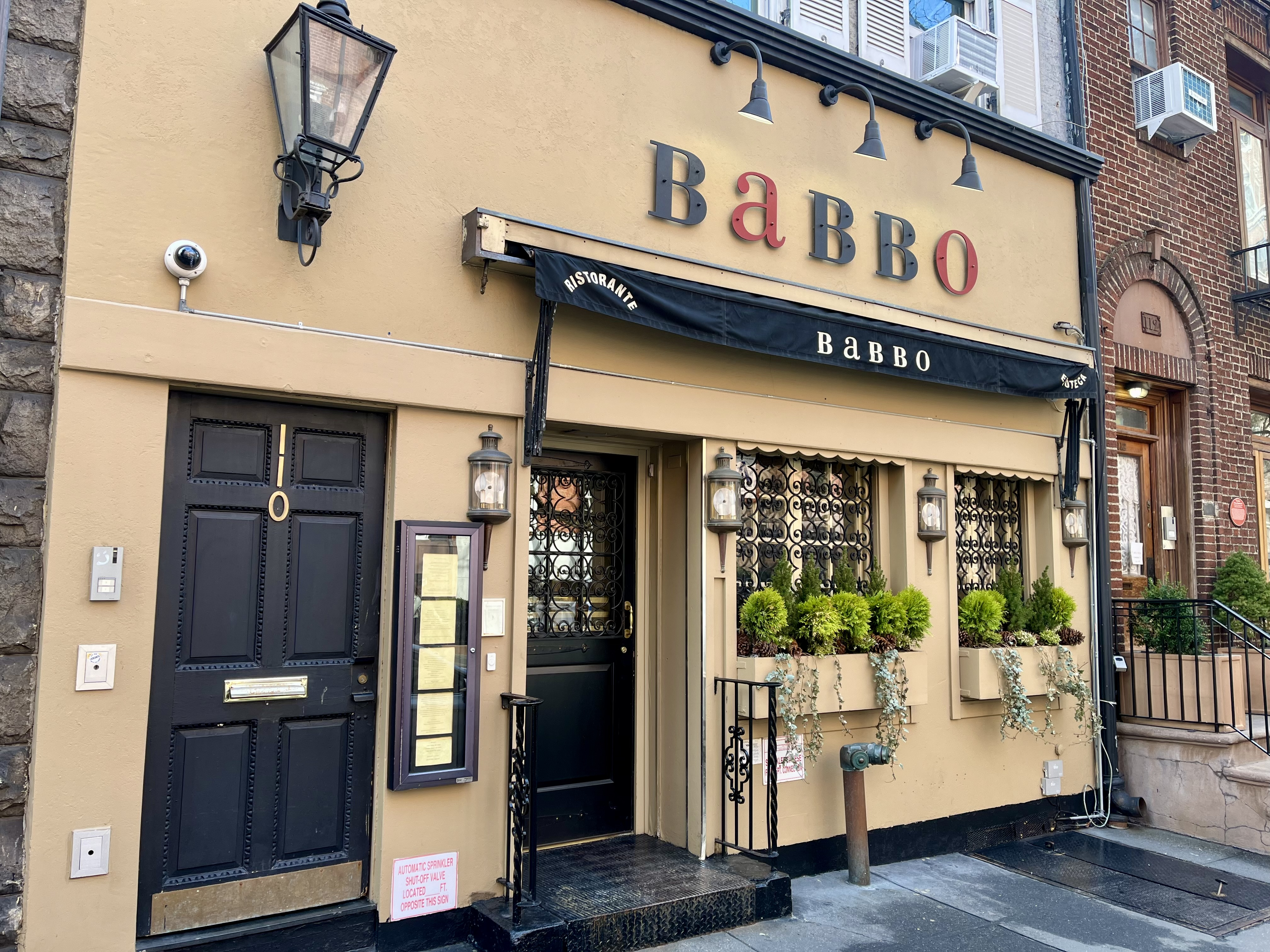
- Babbo in March 2024
- Interactive map of Babbo

Restaurant information
- Owner: Starr Restaurants
- Previous owners: Mario Batali (1998-2019); Joe Bastianich (1998-2025)
- Food type: Italian
- Rating: (Michelin Guide) (2006-2008,2014-2019)
- Location: 110 Waverly Place, New York City, New York, 10011, United States
- Coordinates: 40°43′56.7″N 73°59′57.1″W
- Seating capacity: 90
- Website: babbonyc.com

Babbo Ristorante e Enoteca is an Italian restaurant in New York City.

Opened in 1998 by Mario Batali, it received the James Beard Foundation Award for Best New Restaurant the following year. Batali sold his ownership stake in the restaurant in 2019 after being embroiled in misconduct claims.

After being sold to Starr Restaurants in February 2025, Babbo reopened eight months later. The restaurant received a Michelin star for several years and was featured in the book Heat by Bill Buford.

== See also ==
- List of Italian restaurants
