= The Clocktower (restaurant) =

Restaurant in Manhattan, New York

- Location within New York City

Restaurant information
- Established: 2015
- Owner: Stephen Starr
- Head chef: Jason Atherton
- Food type: English
- Location: 5 Madison Avenue, New York City, New York, 10010, United States
- Coordinates: 40.741222°N 73.987500°W
- Website: theclocktowernyc.com

The Clocktower is an English cuisine restaurant at the Metropolitan Life Insurance Company Tower in the Flatiron District of Manhattan, New York City, United States. Despite its name it is on the second floor of the building, not in the structure's clock tower. The Clocktower received a Michelin star in the 2018 Michelin Guide for New York City. The restaurant lost the star in 2022.

To enter the restaurant, diners walk through the lobby of the Edition Hotel, also located in the building. The Clocktower is a collaboration between Philadelphia-based restaurateur Stephen Starr and London-based chef Jason Atherton. It is Atherton's first restaurant project in the United States.

== Design ==
The restaurant has a dining area, a separate bar, and a room with a billiards table. The dining area is split into three separate rooms. The restaurant is decorated throughout with black and white photographs, mostly taken in New York City. Guests are provided a booklet with information about the pictures upon request.

=== Tableware ===
Much of the tableware used at the Clocktower was sourced by Starr employee Randi Sirkin from the website Etsy. Atherton was also involved in the selection process. The tableware includes porcelain plates decorated with skulls wearing crowns and other regal paraphernalia, which Atherton now uses in some of his restaurants in London and Singapore.

== See also ==
- List of Michelin-starred restaurants in New York City
