= Armani Ristorante =

Italian restaurant in Dubai

- Interactive map of Armani Ristorante

Restaurant information
- Food type: Italian
- Coordinates: 25.19681°N 55.27433°E

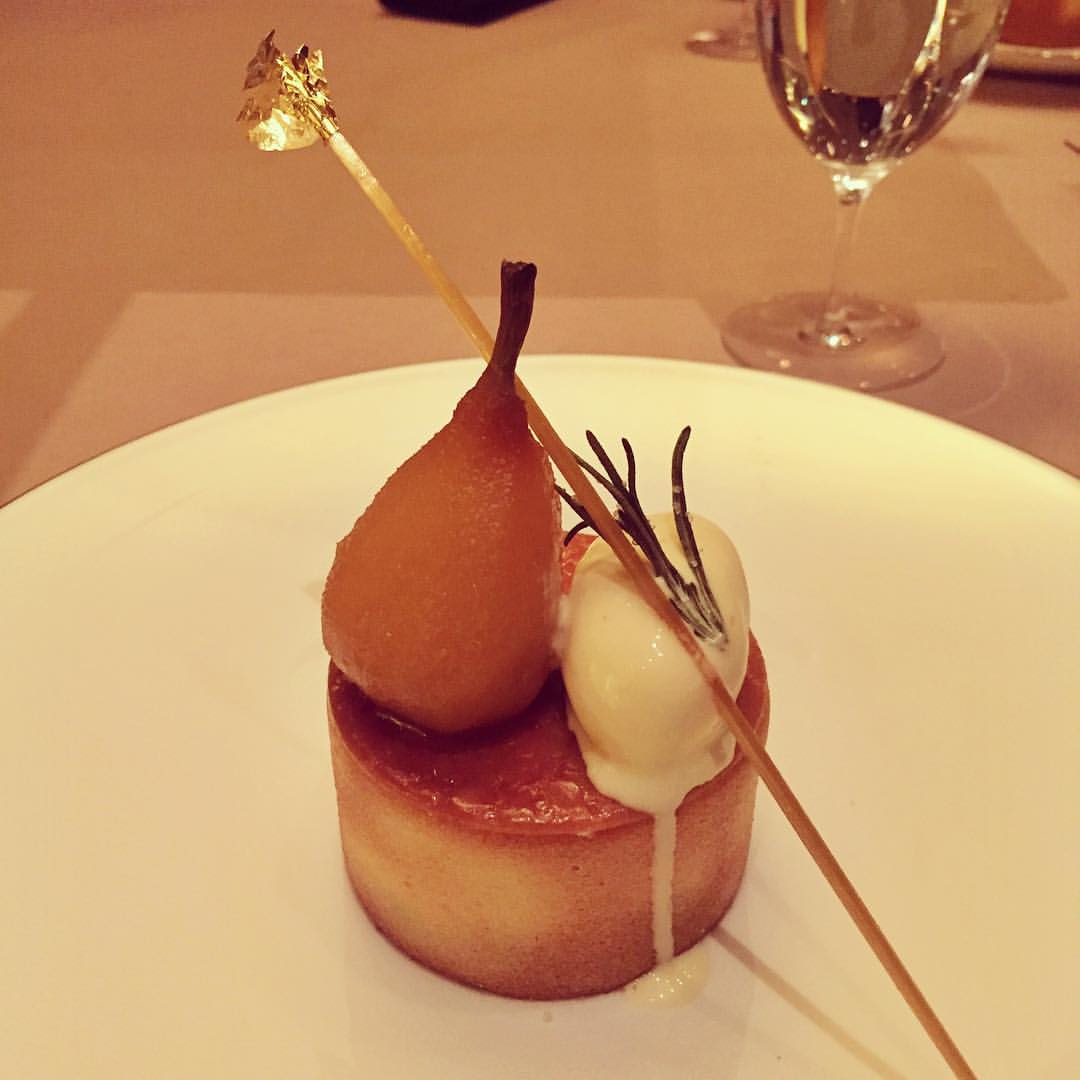
Armani Ristorante - 2016

Armani Ristorante is a Michelin-starred restaurant in Dubai. It serves Italian cuisine. Giovanni Papi was the head chef.

== See also ==
- List of Italian restaurants
- List of Michelin-starred restaurants in Dubai
