= Hōseki =

Japanese restaurant in Dubai

Coordinates: 25°12′40.2″N 55°14′4.9″E

- Interactive map of Hōseki

Restaurant information
- Food type: Japanese

Hōseki is a Michelin-starred restaurant in Dubai. It serves Japanese cuisine.

== See also ==
- List of Japanese restaurants
- List of Michelin-starred restaurants in Dubai
