= Torno Subito =

Italian restaurant in Dubai

Restaurant information
- Food type: Italian

Torno Subito is a Michelin-starred restaurant in Dubai. It serves Italian cuisine.

== See also ==
- List of Italian restaurants
- List of Michelin-starred restaurants in Dubai
