= Moonrise (restaurant) =

Restaurant in Dubai, United Arab Emirates

- Interactive map of Moonrise

Restaurant information
- Established: 2021
- Chef: Solemann Haddad
- Rating: (Michelin Guide); 16/20 (Gault Millau)
- Location: 41st Street, Al Satwa, Dubai, United Arab Emirates
- Coordinates: 25°13′12″N 55°16′35″E
- Website: moon-rise.xyz

Moonrise is a Michelin-starred restaurant in Dubai, United Arab Emirates. Solemann Haddad is the founder and chef.

== Description ==
The restaurant’s cuisine emphasizes creativity and seasonality, with a strong focus on technique and narrative. According to Gault & Millau UAE, Moonrise is noted for “pushing boundaries” and for its thoughtful use of produce, presenting dishes that highlight both precision and innovation.

== Recognition ==
Moonrise received a Michelin star, placing it among a select group of internationally recognized restaurants in Dubai. Its inclusion in the Michelin Guide has been cited as evidence of the city’s increasing prominence on the global fine-dining stage. The restaurant has also been featured in international media coverage examining Dubai’s culinary rise, including The New York Times.

== See also ==
- List of Michelin-starred restaurants in Dubai
