= Pollen Street Social =

Restaurant in London, England

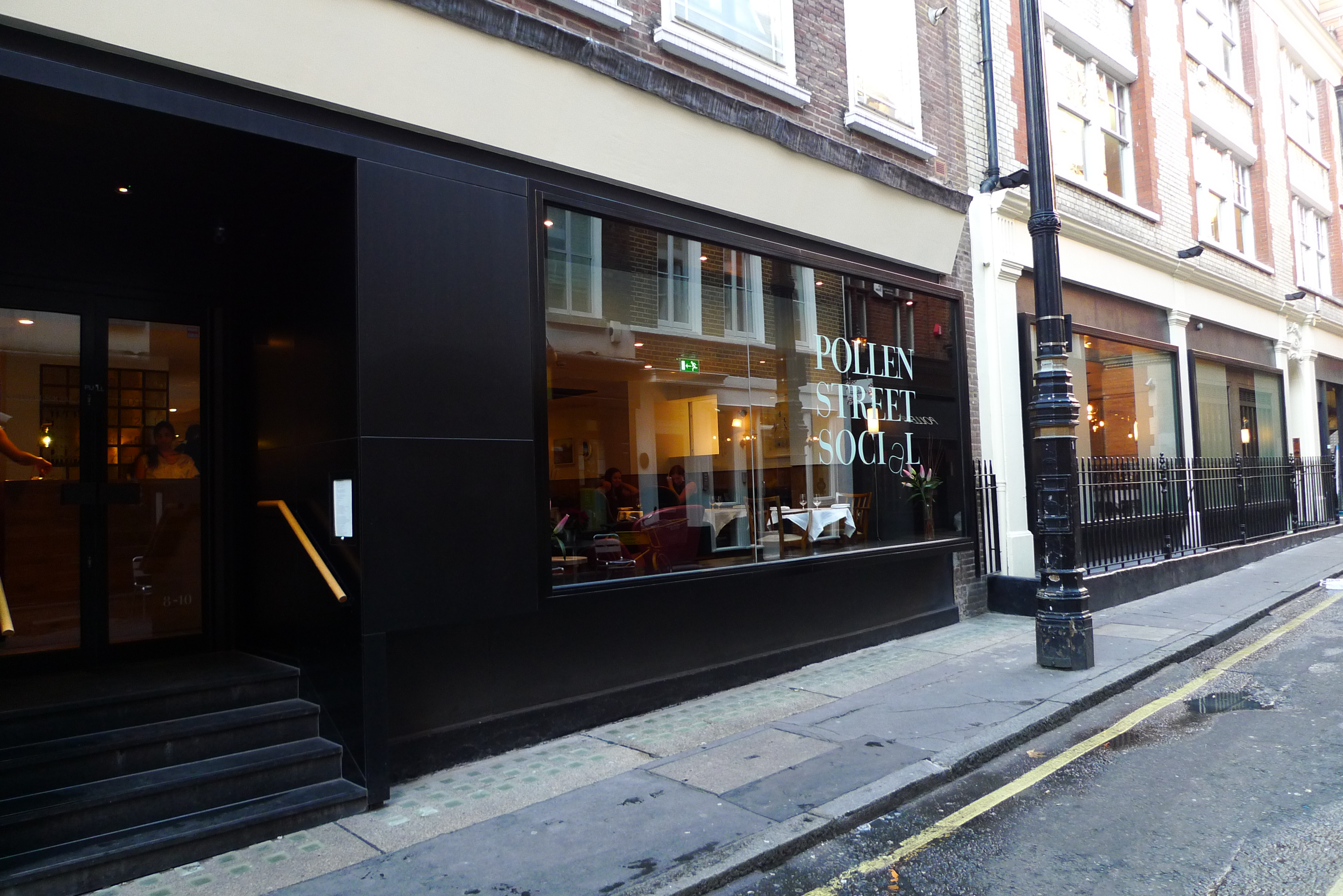
- The exterior of Pollen Street Social
- Interactive map of Pollen Street Social

Restaurant information
- Established: 2011 (15 years ago)
- Closed: 31 July 2024 (2 years ago)
- Owner: Jason Atherton
- Head chef: Dale Bainbridge
- Food type: Modern European
- Dress code: Casual
- Rating: (Michelin Guide 2022); AA Rosettes
- Location: Pollen Street, Mayfair, London, W1, United Kingdom
- Coordinates: 51.5133°N 0.1423°W
- Seating capacity: 60
- Reservations: Yes
- Other information: Nearest station: Oxford Circus
- Website: pollenstreetsocial.com

Pollen Street Social was a restaurant in London, England, run by chef Jason Atherton.

It was Atherton's first UK solo restaurant, and in 2011 was named the best new UK restaurant by the Good Food Guide, and the best new fine-dining restaurant in London by Time Out. It held one Michelin star, which it gained within a year of opening and maintained until its closure. Elements in the restaurant such as the dessert bar were subsequently included in Atherton's other restaurants.

On 22 March 2024, Atherton announced on Instagram that the restaurant would be closing permanently on 31 July 2024.

== Description ==
Atherton had previously worked for Gordon Ramsay for ten years before opening his first restaurant, Table No. 1 in Shanghai. In 2011, he opened his first UK-based restaurant, Pollen Street Social, which became his flagship location. The name came from the location of the restaurant, and Atherton described the "social" name saying, "I spend quite a lot of time in New York, and places like Stanton Social are popping up; and it's based around people being able to use a fine-dining restaurant for anything they want, not just for the food, but for the atmosphere, for the Champagne, for the private areas, for the bar. So it's a social place."

It was funded by twenty years of Atherton's savings, as well as several minor investors in addition to a single private investor who owned 25%. He was relieved that there was a reasonable gap after the opening of Dinner by Heston Blumenthal, due to the buzz caused by Blumenthal's restaurant. The restaurant was located at 8-10 Pollen Street, London, where previously a Pitcher & Piano public house was located. Prior to opening the restaurant, he opened a pop-up restaurant for two days in October 2010 to preview the menu to be served at Pollen Street Social.

The interior of the restaurant was split into two separate rooms, with the bar located away from the main dining area which seated sixty diners. The tables in the dining room were located around a central service area, while the kitchen was at the back of the room, near the dessert bar. The dessert bar allowed diners to watch the pastry chefs prepare the desserts.

Elements from Pollen Street Social were subsequently introduced to other restaurants run by Atherton. These included the dessert bar, which has been replicated in Atherton's Singapore based Pollen restaurant. Atherton described the most-used piece of equipment at the restaurant as a Thermomix, a blender which also heats the food which is used for purées and making hollandaise sauce.

=== Menu ===
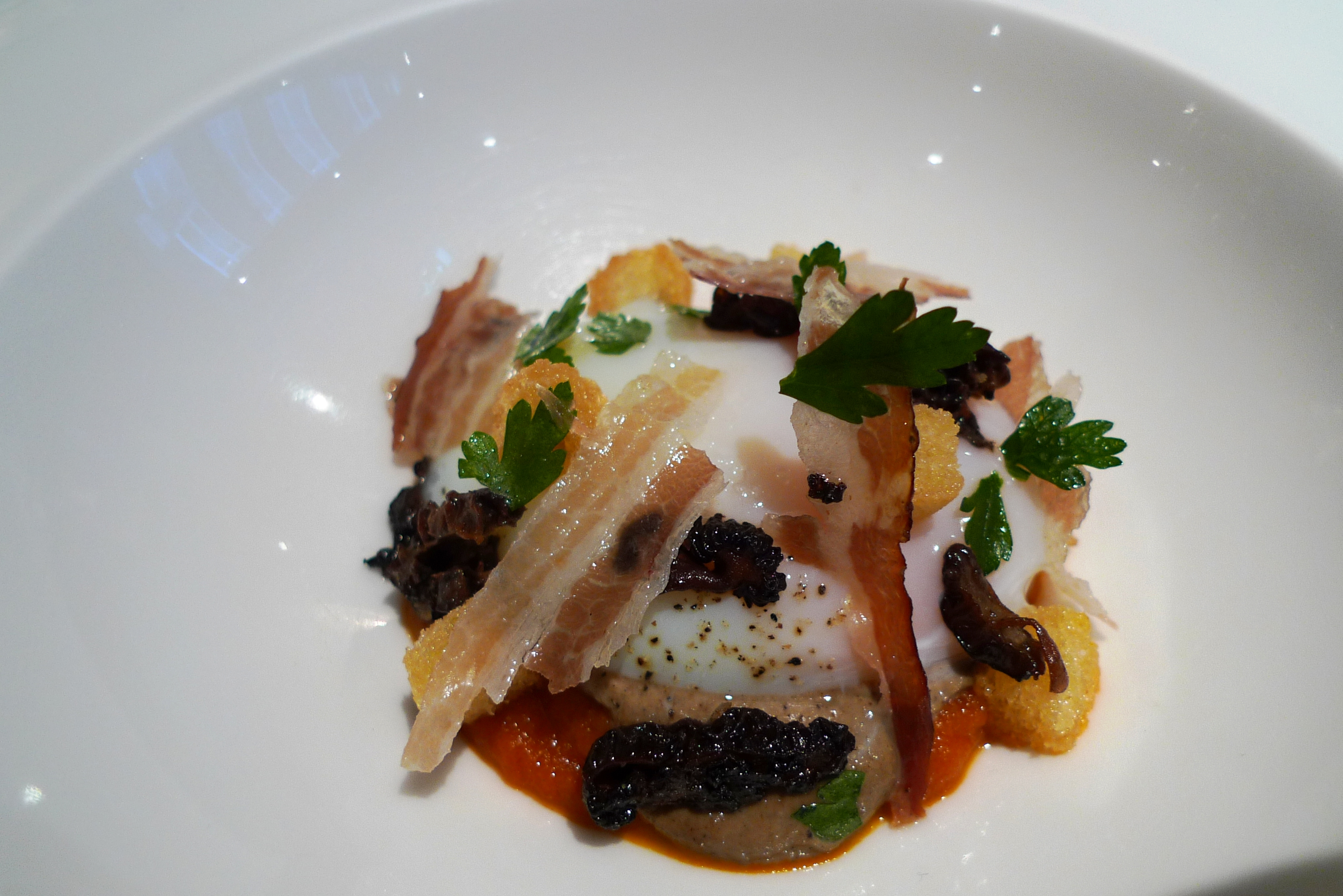
A de-constructed full English breakfast

The initial menu was criticised by critics for being overcomplicated. Due to Atherton's history of working at Maze, there was confusion over whether certain small plates were starters and which were sharing platters. Within a month of opening, this was reduced down to eight starters and eight main courses. The desserts included the signature "PBJ", which features peanut butter mousse, cherry jam and rice puffs.

== Reception ==
John Walsh, writing for The Independent described a mackerel dish as being inspired by the Danish restaurant Noma and praised the inventiveness of the dessert bar. He praised the staff, and summed up the restaurant saying, "There's a great deal to enjoy at Pollen Street Social. Jason Atherton has put his heart and soul and his considerable imagination into it, and it shows." The Daily Telegraph's Zoe Williams thought the interior looked "like a posh All Bar One", and while she praised the starters, she was underwhelmed by the main courses. She gave it a rating of six out of ten. Zoe Strimpel, in her review for City A.M. said that she would return to the restaurant "in a heartbeat". She singled out a smoked foie gras starter for praise, saying that it equalled the meat fruit at Dinner by Heston Blumenthal. She also praised a pork belly main course which was served with seeds, beetroot and chips.

The restaurant was awarded a Michelin star within a year of opening. The restaurant was also awarded the title of BMW Square Meal Restaurant of the Year 2011. In 2012, it was named the best new UK restaurant by the Good Food Guide after it was ranked eighth on their list of the top-fifty restaurants. Individual it was given a score of eight out of ten.

It subsequently increased in rank to sixth overall in the 2012 list. Time Out named Pollen Street Social as London's best new fine-dining restaurant in 2011. In 2014, the restaurant won Food and Travel Magazine's Readers Award's "UK Restaurant of the Year".

== See also ==
- List of Michelin-starred restaurants in Greater London
- List of restaurants in London
