= Trèsind Studio =

Indian restaurant in Dubai

Restaurant information
- Food type: Indian
- Rating: (Michelin Guide)

Trèsind Studio is a Michelin-starred restaurant in Dubai. It serves Indian cuisine. In May 2025, it became the first Indian restaurant in the world to be awarded three Michelin stars.

== See also ==
- List of Indian restaurants
- List of Michelin-starred restaurants in Dubai
