= Tower Theater (Pennsylvania) =

Music venue in Upper Darby Township, Pennsylvania

Coordinates: 39.961167°N 75.258905°W

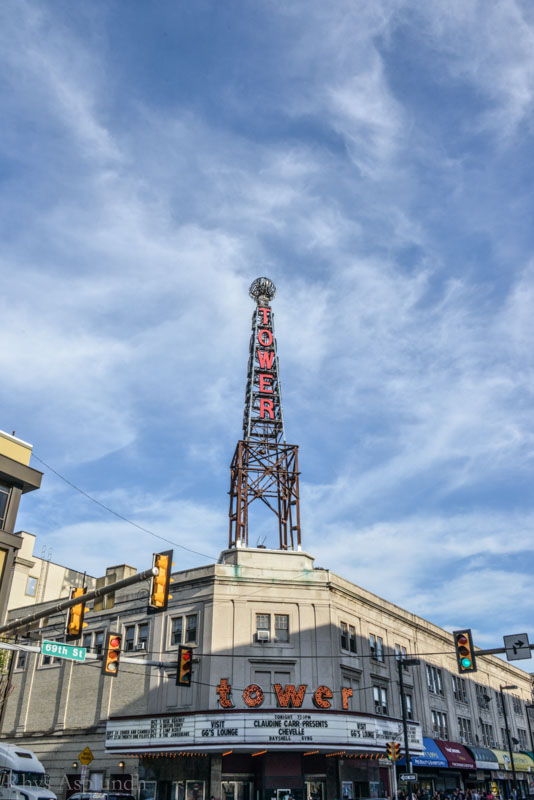
- Tower Theater in August 2014
- Interactive map of Tower Theater
- Location: 69th and Ludlow Streets Upper Darby Township, Pennsylvania, U.S.
- Seating type: Reserved
- Capacity: 3,119
- Type: Indoor music theatre

Construction
- Opened: 1927
- Closed: 2022

Website
- venue.thetowerphilly.com

The Tower Theater is a currently-closed music venue in Upper Darby Township, Pennsylvania, a suburb of Philadelphia. It opened in 1927, and has been a globally popular venue for music acts since the 1970s. In 2018, the Tower Theater was named one of the ten best live music venues in the United States by Rolling Stone magazine.

Known for its acoustic properties, the venue has been used for recording live albums by many bands. It is a theater located in the Terminal Square section of Upper Darby Township, Pennsylvania at the intersection of 69th and Ludlow Streets. It is adjacent to 69th Street Terminal just outside of West Philadelphia.

== History ==
=== 20th century ===
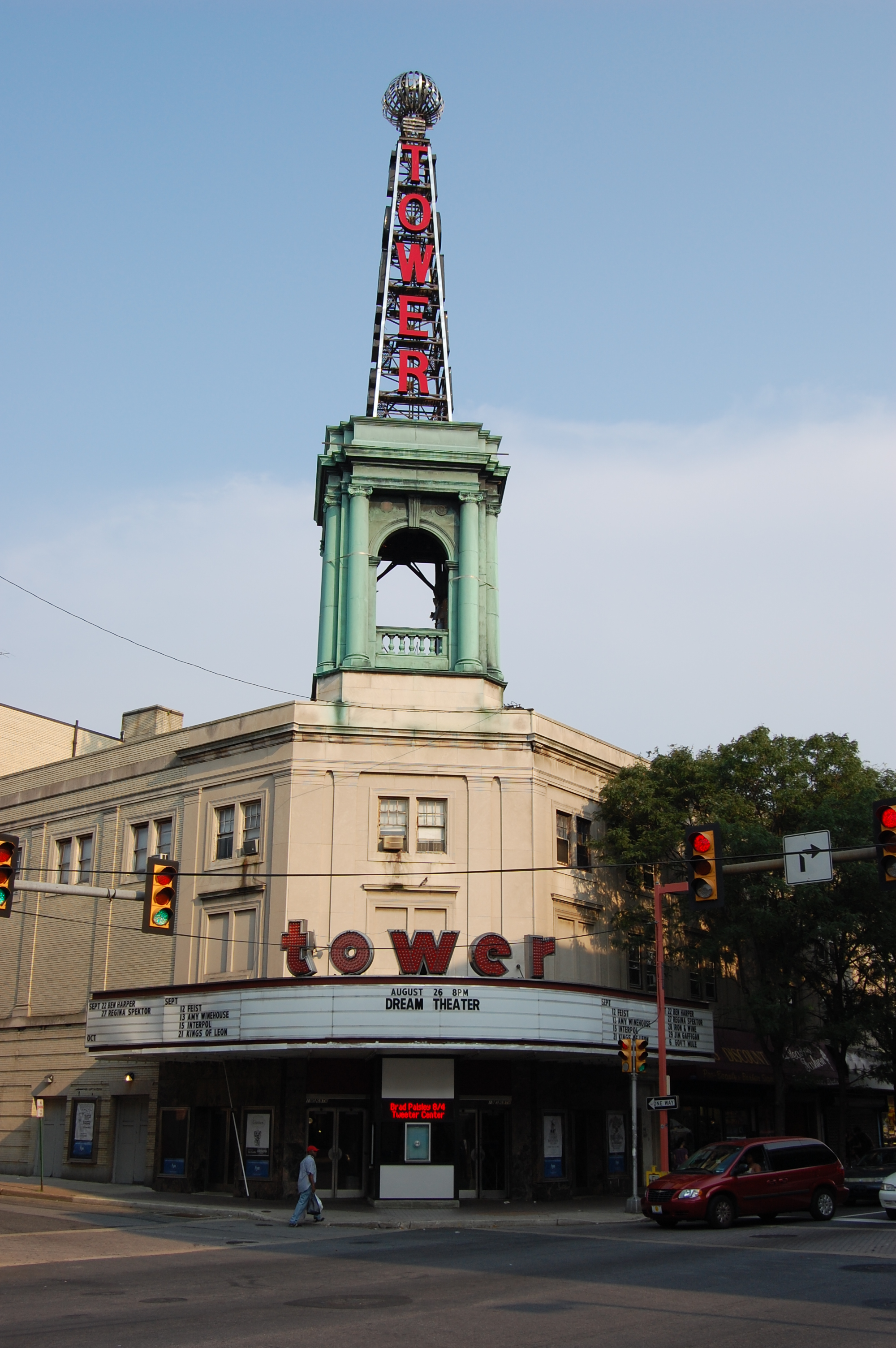
Tower Theater in August 2007

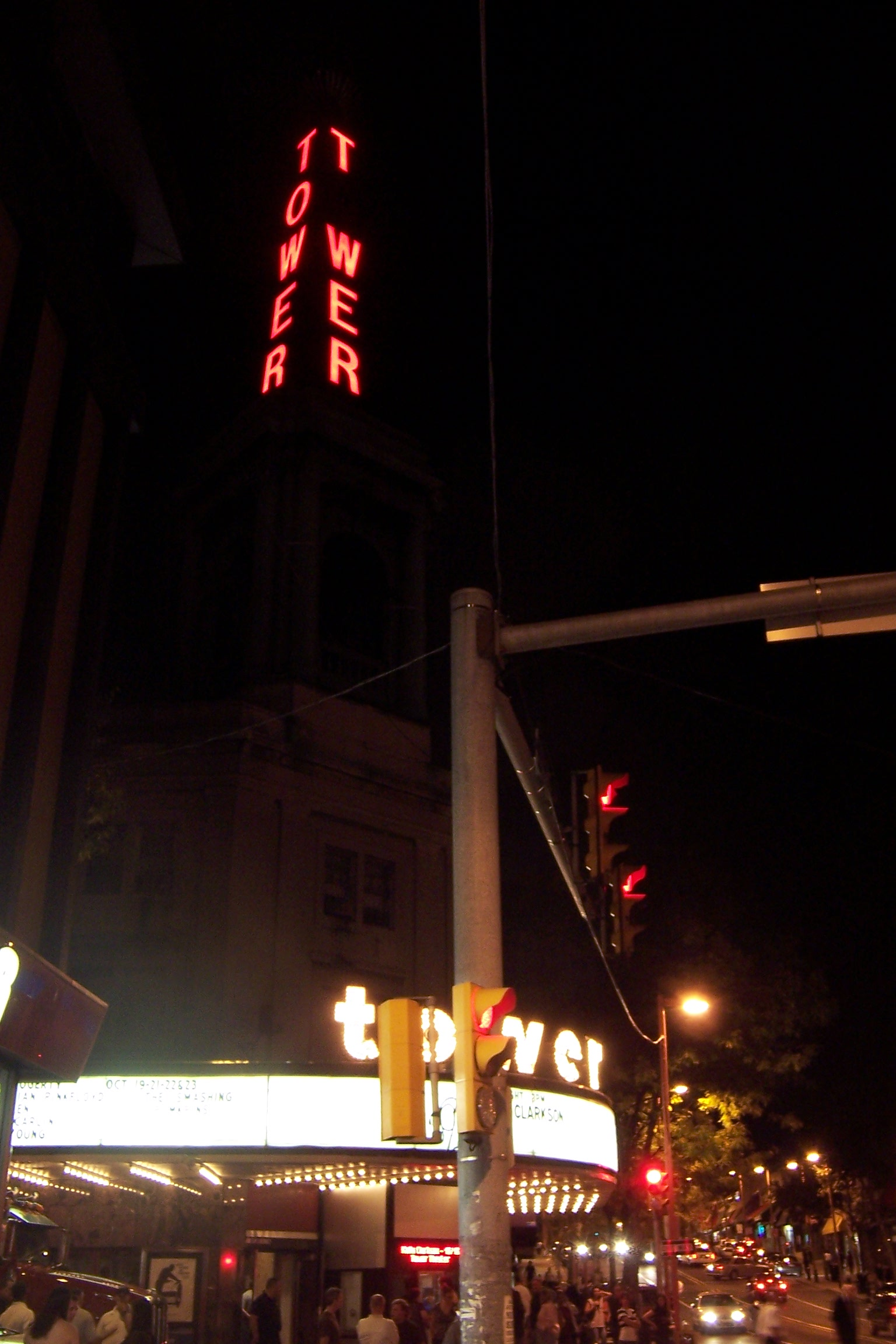
The nighttime scene outside a Kelly Clarkson concert at the Tower Theater in October 2007

The Tower Theater, built in 1927, was opened the following year by John H. McClatchy as one of Upper Darby Township's first movie houses. Located just outside the city limits of Philadelphia, the theater thrived in the busy area that was once the most highly traveled route to Center City from the west. In its early years, Tower Theater showed both vaudeville acts and movies.

By the 1970s, the Tower, then owned by the A.M. Ellis chain, had fallen on hard times, and was showing third-run movies for $1 admission.

In 1972, after refurbishing the theater from a severe fire, Midnight Sun Concerts promoted its first concert at the Tower. The sold-out show featured Dave Mason and Buzzy Linhart on June 14. Reviewer Jonathan Takiff of the Philadelphia Daily News wrote the following day that, "Philly Finally Has its Fillmore", making reference to New York City's famed Fillmore East.

Midnight Sun was formed by Rick Green, its president and talent booker; Peter Wertimer, who met Rick while a student at Penn in charge of the university's concerts and who later became Rick's stage manager at a series of shows at the Central Theater in Passaic, NJ; and Billy Stevenson, Peter's friend and stage managing partner who had seen movies at the Tower as a kid. After booking several Dave Mason shows, Rick made Midnight Sun's home at 69th and Market. Peter became the company's general manager, handling advertising and PR between shows and transitioning to house manager on show days. Billy served as backstage manager. Other notable employees were Pat Gibbons, the first box office manager who went on to act as business manager for David Bowie and Joe Jackson; David Fricke who assisted in Press Relations before graduating to become a writer at Rolling Stone; and Debbie Gold who would go on to a career in record production.

In 1972, the Tower introduced David Bowie and the Spiders from Mars and Genesis with Peter Gabriel, to the United States. Then unknown, Genesis played a midnight concert with a $4 admission price. Bowie and Genesis's Phil Collins would subsequently mention their Tower shows as being instrumental in introducing them to an American audience.

In September 1974, Bruce Springsteen, who had an early, strong, and long-lived fan base in Philadelphia, introduced the world to his new E Street Band, with Max Weinberg and Roy Bittan, at the Tower Theater. It was the first time in his career that Springsteen earned $5,000 for a night's work. He returned in early November for two sold-out shows, a year prior to his big breakthrough with Born to Run and its associated publicity.

Other regular Midnight Sun headliners at the Tower included Jackson Browne, Lou Reed, Steve Miller, Kiss, Blue Öyster Cult, Stevie Wonder, Miles Davis and various editions of the Jerry Garcia/Merle Saunders band. David Bowie repaid his Philly fans by recording his 1974 David Live album during a long run of shows at the Tower. The Average White Band's live album, Person to Person, was recorded at the Tower with Atlantic Records' Arif Mardin in the production truck behind the theater.

In late 1975, the owners informed Midnight Sun that they were selling the theater to the promoter's much larger competitor, Electric Factory Concerts. The final Midnight Sun produced show at the Tower was 10cc, the British pop quartet, with Rory Gallagher opening, on December 5, 1975.

In October 1977, Irish rock band Thin Lizzy recorded their live album Still Dangerous, which was released on March 2, 2009.

A 1980 performance by Paul Simon was developed into Paul Simon in Concert, and released a second time in 2003 as Live at the Tower Theatre.

Prince performed twice at Tower Theater: March 13, 1982 and January 7, 1997.

Pink Floyd guitarist David Gilmour performed three solo concerts at the Theater in May 1984 in support of his About Face album.

The Tower Theater happened to be a popular venue for Berliner's Tangerine Dream since they played here four times on their North American tours. Dates included April 6, 1977; June 25, 1986; September 10, 1988; and October 10, 1992.

Metal acts Anthrax, Exodus and Helloween also performed at the theater during the Headbangers Ball Tour in 1989. It was not unusual at a Tower show to observe the following rock journalists huddling together during the intermission and comparing notes: David Fricke, Matt Damsker, Bill Mandel, Jon Takiff, John David Kalodner, together with Ed Sciaky and Michael Tearson from the city's progressive rock radio station WMMR.

A concert by Jethro Tull on November 25, 1987 was recorded for broadcast by the King Biscuit Flower Hour. On November 10, 1988, a performance by Pat Benatar was recorded by Westwood One for the "Superstar Concert Series".

Nine Inch Nails performed May 15, 1994 on the first leg of their Self Destruct Tour.

=== 21st century ===
By the 2000s, the theater continued to be active, filling much the same role in the concert hierarchy as the Beacon Theatre in New York City. The theater operates under the Live Nation/Electric Factory Concerts name.

On August 13, 2019, the tower on top of the venue was removed due to structural issues with the base; the ball and lettering are to be donated to a local museum. Replacement plans are under development.

=== Closure ===
The Tower Theater closed in 2022. Its owner, Live Nation, says it will be closed until they "can ascertain the status of other properties in the area."
