= Row on 45 =

Restaurant in Dubai, United Arab Emirates

- Location within Dubai

Restaurant information
- Manager: Petr Krajča
- Head chef: Jason Atherton
- Chef: Rahul Shrestha
- Pastry chef: Noor Syed
- Dress code: Smart and trendy
- Rating: (Michelin Guide); 17.5/20 (Gault Millau) (Forbes Travel Guide)
- Location: Grosvenor House, Al Emreef Street, Dubai, United Arab Emirates
- Coordinates: 25°05′10″N 55°08′37″E
- Website: rowon45dubai.com

Row on 45 is a Michelin-starred restaurant in Dubai, United Arab Emirates.

== See also ==
- List of Michelin-starred restaurants in Dubai
