= Aimee Olexy =

American restaurateur

Aimee Olexy is an American restaurateur based in Pennsylvania. She is the co-founder of Talula's Table (2007) in Kennett Square, and a business partner with Stephen Starr in the Philadelphia restaurants Talula's Garden (2011), Talula's Daily (2012), and The Love (Philadelphia restaurant) (2017).

== Biography ==
Olexy grew up in West Chester, Pennsylvania. In the late 1980s, at age 13, she landed a restaurant job in Conshohocken, Pennsylvania at Spring Mill Café, where she swept, waitressed and sometimes cooked. At Henderson High, Olexy skipped much of 10th grade to sell bagels with sprouts and scrambled eggs at Grateful Dead concerts.

Told she would have to repeat 10th grade, the 16-year-old Olexy dropped out of school and got her GED. At 17, she enrolled at St. Joseph's University, and, in 1994, she graduated summa cum laude with a degree in English literature, followed by an MBA. She left for France and attended l’Universitie du Vin.

== Career ==
In 1999, Olexy returned to Philadelphia and got jobs relating to operations in the restaurant industry. Her first position with Starr was general manager of Blue Angel, his Center City, Philadelphia French bistro. She was promoted to director of restaurants and, in 2000, opened Pod.

With husband Bryan Sikora, she opened Django on Society Hill. They sold it in 2006, and moved to Kennett Square, on the outskirts of Philadelphia. A year later they rehabbed a former shoe store there and opened Talula's Table, which was subsequently featured by The New York Times Magazine, Saveur, NBC News, NPR, and CBS News. The restaurant earned a four bell rating from The Philadelphia Inquirer. The couple divorced in 2010.

In 2011, as sole owner of Talula's Table, Olexy partnered with Starr to open Talula's Garden. and, a year later, Talula's Daily.

== Awards and honors ==
In 2018, Talula's Table was nominated for Outstanding Restaurant by the James Beard Foundation and was included in the Saveur 100 list. The Love was named one of the best new restaurants of 2018 by Esquire.
