= Electric Factory Concerts =

American concert promotion firm

- Type: Private
- Industry: Music
- Founded: 1968; 58 years ago
- Headquarters: Philadelphia, Pennsylvania, U.S.
- Key people: Larry Magid
- Products: Concerts

Electric Factory Concerts is a Philadelphia-based concert promotion firm, affiliated with the former Electric Factory venue in that city. It was founded by Herbert Spivak, who ran the business with his brothers Jerry Spivak and Allen Spivak. They later hired Larry Magid to become General Manager, and he also became a co-owner of the company.

On February 2, 1968, Electric Factory Concerts (EFC) held its first concert staging, the Quaker City Rock Festival, which was hosted at a secondary location called The Spectrum (arena), because the event was too large for the Factory to occupy concert-goers. The event featured several artists such as Vanilla Fudge, Buddy Guy, and The Chambers Brothers. It survived the closing of the original Electric Factory venue and went on to prosper at a different Philadelphia location. It became prominent in promoting concerts at all venues in the Philadelphia area, including many at the Philadelphia Spectrum.

In late 1975, Electric Factory Concerts bought the Tower Theater from its owner Midnight Sun. About a year later, Midnight Sun commenced an antitrust action against Electric Factory and its secret concert partner, Spectrum Corporation, in the United States District Court for the Eastern District of Pennsylvania. The suit dragged on for several years and was eventually settled for approximately $1 million, as reported in Rolling Stone and the Philadelphia newspapers. A later antitrust suit by rock promoter Stephen Starr against Electric Factory Concerts was also settled for the same amount in 1990, which then financed Starr's rise as a star in the restaurant industry.

Electric Factory Concerts remains the dominant Philadelphia concert promoter, though the brand is now owned by Live Nation Entertainment.

The International Association of Theatrical Stage Employees, Local 8 has called for a boycott of all Electric Factory Concert events, stating that the promoter "(undermines) the area standard."

== History ==
During the development of concert industry in the 1960s and 1970s, the current Electric Factory building, back then it was just an old tire shop, was a key component for Larry Magid when he established Electric Factory Concerts. At the time, Philadelphia did not have live concert venues, or major entertainment venues for that matter. Magid’s interest in live music sparked the idea to establish the first venue that would bring music into the area. As Magid became more involved in the entertainment business, he ran into Spivak, who wanted advice for getting into the rock and roll scene. Magid said he would need his own venue, and that is when Spivak, with Magid by his side, acquired an old tire factory, which would become the Electric Factory. Together, they created their production company, Electric Factory concerts, and got to work on expanding and promoting their business.

Since 1968, co-founders of Electric Factory Concerts, Larry Magid and Allen Spivak, have made Electric Factory Concerts one of the largest concert venues and promoters globally. They remain one of the few independent concert promoters, too. The pair offered one of the first live music venues (1968) and from since then remained pioneers of this industry. Magid even claimed that he and his cohort “created the concert business” in a 2018 interview.

== Popular Productions ==
Following the first American arena rock show, EFC has headlined major names in the music and entertainment industry. The late 1960s brought a wave of business in rock concert promotion, and EFC was a dominant promoter. In 1969 alone, known as the “summer of rock festivals”, EFC promoted huge names in the concert and festival industry. Several included Led Zeppelin, Blood, Sweat & Tears, Tom Rush, and the Atlantic City Pop Festival, which is considered the groundbreaker for EFC, which generated over 110,000 attendees. In 1985, they were known as the American producers of LiveAid, which had over 1.5 billion global viewers.
