= Stephen Starr =

American restaurateur

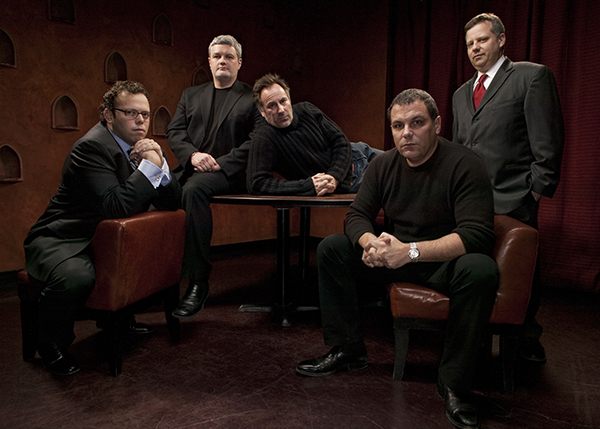
- Restaurateur Stephen Starr, foreground, with business partners in 2004
- Born: c. 1957; Philadelphia, Pennsylvania, US
- Occupation: Restaurateur
- Years active: 1995-present

Stephen Starr (born 1957) is an American restaurateur and former entertainment promoter based in Philadelphia. He owns the Starr Restaurants group which operates over 40 restaurants. He has restaurants in many different areas both in the United States as well as overseas. These restaurants include Barclay Prime, Buddakan, Butcher and Singer, The Continental Mid-town, The Dandelion, El Rey, El Vez, Fette Sau, Frankford Hall, Le Diplomate, Makoto, Morimoto, Osteria Mozza DC, Parc, Pastis, Stella, Talula's Daily, Talula's Garden, and The Love in Philadelphia with Aimee Olexy. Starr has been recognized for his work, and has received awards from the James Beard Foundation among others.

== Early life and education ==
Starr was born in Philadelphia, Pennsylvania. He grew up in Woodbury Heights, New Jersey, where he attended Gateway Regional High School. He later attended the School of Media and Communication at Temple University in Philadelphia.

== Career ==
=== Promoter ===
Starr's first venue was the diner and comedy club "Grandmom Minnie's" located in Philadelphia's Old City. On September 16, 1977, Starr opened the cabaret "Stars" featuring emerging acts. In March 1981, Starr opened the concert venue and disco "Ripley Music Hall." In February 1984, Starr founded The Concert Company, which brought large-scale stadium acts to Philadelphia. The company was purchased by Electric Factory Concerts in 1990.

=== STARR Restaurants ===
Stephen Starr founded STARR Restaurants in 1995. In September 1995, Starr opened his first restaurant in Philadelphia, "Continental Restaurant & Martini Bar". As of 2025, there are 19 Starr Restaurants in Philadelphia; nine in New York City; four in Florida; six in Washington, D.C.; and one opening in Nashville.

=== Awards ===
Starr won the 2017 "Outstanding Restaurateur" James Beard Foundation Award; and his restaurant Le Coucou, with chef Daniel Rose, was named 2017 "Best New Restaurant" by the James Beard Foundation. His restaurant The Clocktower, with chef Jason Atherton, was awarded a Michelin star in the 2018 Michelin Guide. Starr has been named "Restaurateur of the Year" by both Bon Appétit and Zagat. Travel + Leisure noted that "Starr creates complete environments with an artistic, almost cerebral approach."

In 2017, the magazine Restaurant Hospitality placed Stephen Starr on their "RH 25" list of "The 25 most powerful multiconcept operators across the country." Restaurant Hospitality also awarded Starr the annual Richard Melman Innovator of the Year award in 2013 and cited his restaurants in Philadelphia as "arguably the key reason for the city's revitalized culinary scene." The Harvard Observer recognized Starr "for making contributions of outstanding artistic significance to the field of restaurant hospitality over the whole of his career."

== Film and television ==
Starr was guest judge on the "Restaurant Wars" episode of the reality television show Top Chef: Season 5, which aired in 2009.

Starr appeared in the 2007 documentary film "This is My Cheesesteak" directed by Benjamin Daniels.
