= Erth (restaurant) =

Restaurant in Abu Dhabi

Restaurant information
- Food type: Emirati

Erth is a Michelin-starred restaurant in Abu Dhabi. It serves Emirati cuisine.

== See also ==
- List of Michelin-starred restaurants in Abu Dhabi
