= Yenn Wong =

Singaporean restaurateur

Yenn Wong (born 1978) is a Singaporean restaurateur who is the CEO and Founder of the Hong Kong–based JIA Group which runs 12 restaurants across Hong Kong.

== Biography ==
Wong was born in Singapore in 1978 and graduated with a Bachelor's degree in Economics at the University of Western Australia. At the age of 25, she was sent to Hong Kong to help redevelop a hotel in Causeway Bay which was turned into a boutique hotel named J Plus Hotel. She then went to Shanghai where she opened another hotel before opening multiple restaurants across Asia. In 2010, she opened 208 Duecento Otto and over the next 10 years, created a number of restaurants that led the dining trend in Hong Kong including Duddell's, Louise, Ando all of which have been awarded one star MICHELIN. Today she has consolidated her businesses into the running of 12 restaurants and a "delivery platform" in Hong Kong. In 2018, JIA Group successfully listed on the GEM Board of the Hong Kong Stock Exchange (code: 8519).

In 2014 she was named Restaurateur of the Year for her contributions to the Hong Kong dining scene, Outstanding Women Entrepreneur" by the ASEAN Women Entrepreneurs Forum 2015 and "Young Entrepreneur of the Year" by Asia Corporate Excellence & Sustainability 2017, She was appointed as a non-executive director of Gameone Holdings Limited (listed on GEM, stock code: 8282) on 30 September 2015.
