= Jason Atherton =

English chef and restaurateur

- Atherton in 2008
- Born: 6 September 1971 (age 55); Sheffield, South Yorkshire, England
- Education: Boston College, Lincolnshire; Army Catering Corps
- Spouse: Irha Atherton
- Children: 3
- Culinary career
- Cooking style: Modern European
- Ratings
- Michelin stars Mobil; Good Food Guide
- Current restaurants
- Row on 45 Dubai; Row on 5 London; City Social; Sael
- Previous restaurants
- Maze; Pollen Street Social
- Television shows
- Great British Menu; My Kitchen Rules
- Award
- 2 Michelin stars
- Website: https://jasonatherton.co.uk/

Jason Atherton (born 6 September 1971) is an English chef and restaurateur. His flagship restaurant Pollen Street Social gained a Michelin Star in 2011, its opening year, and retained it until its closure in 2024. He was the Executive Chef at Gordon Ramsay's Michelin starred Maze in London until 30 April 2010. In 2014 he co-hosted the Sky Living TV series My Kitchen Rules.

== Early life and education ==
Atherton was born in Sheffield, South Yorkshire. The son of a Skegness hotelier and her vulcaniser husband, he ran away to London at the age of 16 while his parents were on holiday. After training at Boston College, Lincolnshire, he spent six weeks training with the Army Catering Corps, which he hated.

== Career ==
Jason Atherton has worked with chefs including Pierre Koffmann, Nico Ladenis, and Marco Pierre White. He joined the Gordon Ramsay Group in 2001 as the executive chef for Verre in Dubai. In 2005, he returned to the UK and opened Maze.

In November 2007, Atherton and Gordon Ramsay oversaw the launch of Maze in the Hilton Prague Old Town. April 2008 saw the launch of Maze Grill, which sits alongside maze in Grosvenor Square. In 2009 Atherton opened Maze in Cape Town at the One and Only Hotel and also maze restaurants in Melbourne and Qatar.

"Should you hold a knife to my throat and force me to say which one of the chefs in the Gordon Ramsay group I thought was the best, my answer would be Jason Atherton. Actually, I’d admit it without any coercion". – Fay Maschler, Evening Standard, 16.04.08

Atherton left Gordon Ramsay Holdings in 2010 to launch his own restaurant company, The Social Company. He launched his first independent restaurant venture, Table No. 1, at the Waterhouse at South Bund hotel in Shanghai in May 2010. His flagship restaurant has been awarded one Michelin star, Pollen Street Social, opened in April 2011 in Mayfair. The restaurant has been ranked at number six in The Good Food Guide's Top 50 Restaurants 2013 & 2014 and number three in the 2016 guide. It was deemed London's best new fine dining restaurant in the Time Out Eating & Drinking Awards 2011 and won New Restaurant of the Year at the Craft Guild of Chefs Awards 2012. The restaurant has 4 AA Rosettes and has been named the BMW Square Meal Restaurant of the Year 2011. In 2014 the restaurant won Food and Travel Magazine Readers Award's "Restaurant of the Year - UK" and Atherton won Restaurateur of the Year at the Catey Awards. Pollen Street Social closed in 2024 after 13 years of business.

Between 2011 and 2012, Atherton expanded his Asian ventures with Esquina, a tapas bar in Chinatown, Singapore, The Study, a British style cafe, also in Singapore and 22 Ships with Yenn Wong of JIA Group, in Hong Kong.

In 2013, Atherton opened two different ventures in London. The first was Little Social, a French brasserie-style restaurant located opposite his flagship restaurant. A short while later he opened the more casual modern British restaurant, Social Eating House, on Soho's Poland Street, as well as his second venue in Shanghai, The Commune Social, headed by Chef Scott Melvin, formerly of Table No. 1 and Ham & Sherry, his second Hong Kong restaurant. In the autumn of 2013, Atherton launched Berners Tavern within the London EDITION hotel.

2014 saw the openings of 2 new members in the "Social" restaurant family with City Social in Tower 42, London, which won a Michelin star within six months of opening, and Aberdeen Street Social in Hong Kong. City Social lost its star in the 2025 Michelin Guide.

In 2015, Atherton opened his first stateside restaurant The Clocktower within the New York EDITION hotel at the Metropolitan Life Insurance Company Building. This was followed by Social Wine & Tapas in London's Marylebone, a casual tapas bar and wine shop. In September, Atherton opened Marina Social in Dubai, located within the Intercontinental Dubai Marina hotel.

In June 2016, Atherton opened his first restaurant in Cebu, Philippines. The Pig and Palm is a 70-seater with a chef's table, tapas bar, main dining area and a lounge area, designed by architect Lyndon Neri of Neri and Hu, who also designed Atherton's other restaurants Pollen Street Social, Sosharu and Kensington Street Social. This restaurant serves as his love letter to his wife, who is from Cebu. Atherton opened the Temple and Sons restaurant in London in November 2016.

In 2017, in another collaboration with JIA Group, Atherton opened Duddell's London at St Thomas Church in London Bridge.

Atherton's recipes and articles have appeared widely in magazines and newspapers including The Guardian, The Sunday Times, The Observer Food Monthly, Waitrose Food Illustrated, Caterer and Hotelkeeper.

== Books ==
- Maze: The Cookbook, published by Quadrille Publishing Ltd; hardback edition (18 April 2008)
- Gourmet Food for a Fiver, published by Quadrille Publishing Ltd (16 April 2010)
- Social Suppers, published by Absolute Press (19 June 2014)
- Social Sweets, published by Absolute Press (18 June 2015)
- Pollen Street, published by Absolute Press (15 November 2018)

== Television ==
Atherton has become a regular guest on BBC One's Saturday Kitchen, alongside host James Martin.

In 2008, Atherton won the London and Southeast heat of the BBC Two programme Great British Menu – the judges were his old boss Oliver Peyton, alongside Prue Leith and Matthew Fort. He eventually won the starter and main course section in a public vote, in a meal served at The Gherkin, hosted by Heston Blumenthal.

In 2014, Atherton co-hosted the UK series My Kitchen Rules with Lorraine Pascale. The series aired on Sky Living HD, the first show aired on Thursday 23 January 2014.

In 2016, Atherton was a guest judge for an episode in series 8 of MasterChef Australia, with 3 contestants challenged to re-create one of his award-winning dishes.

In 2019, Atherton hosted the BBC show The Chef's Brigade where he took a team of raw cooking talent and, in six weeks, tried to turn them into a Chefs’ Brigade to compete with Europe's finest restaurants.

On 15 July 2023, Jason Atherton's Dubai Dishes; a ten-part cookery series premiered on ITV1. In the series, Atherton makes some of his favourite dishes from Dubai and across the U.A.E. Also featured in the series are dishes from some of Dubai's top chefs.

== Awards ==
- 2000: "Acorn Award", The Caterer
- 2000: "Young Guns Food Award", Daily Express
- 2001: "Best Chef of the Middle East", Time Out Magazine Dubai
- 2006: "Man of the Year", Arena
- 2008: "London's Outstanding Chef", Evening Standard
- 2012: "Chef Award", Catey Awards
- 2013: "Chef of the Year", GQ Awards
- 2014: "Restaurateur of the Year", Catey Awards

== Personal life ==
Atherton lives in southwest London with his Filipino wife Irha and their three daughters.
