= Buddakan =

American restaurant chain

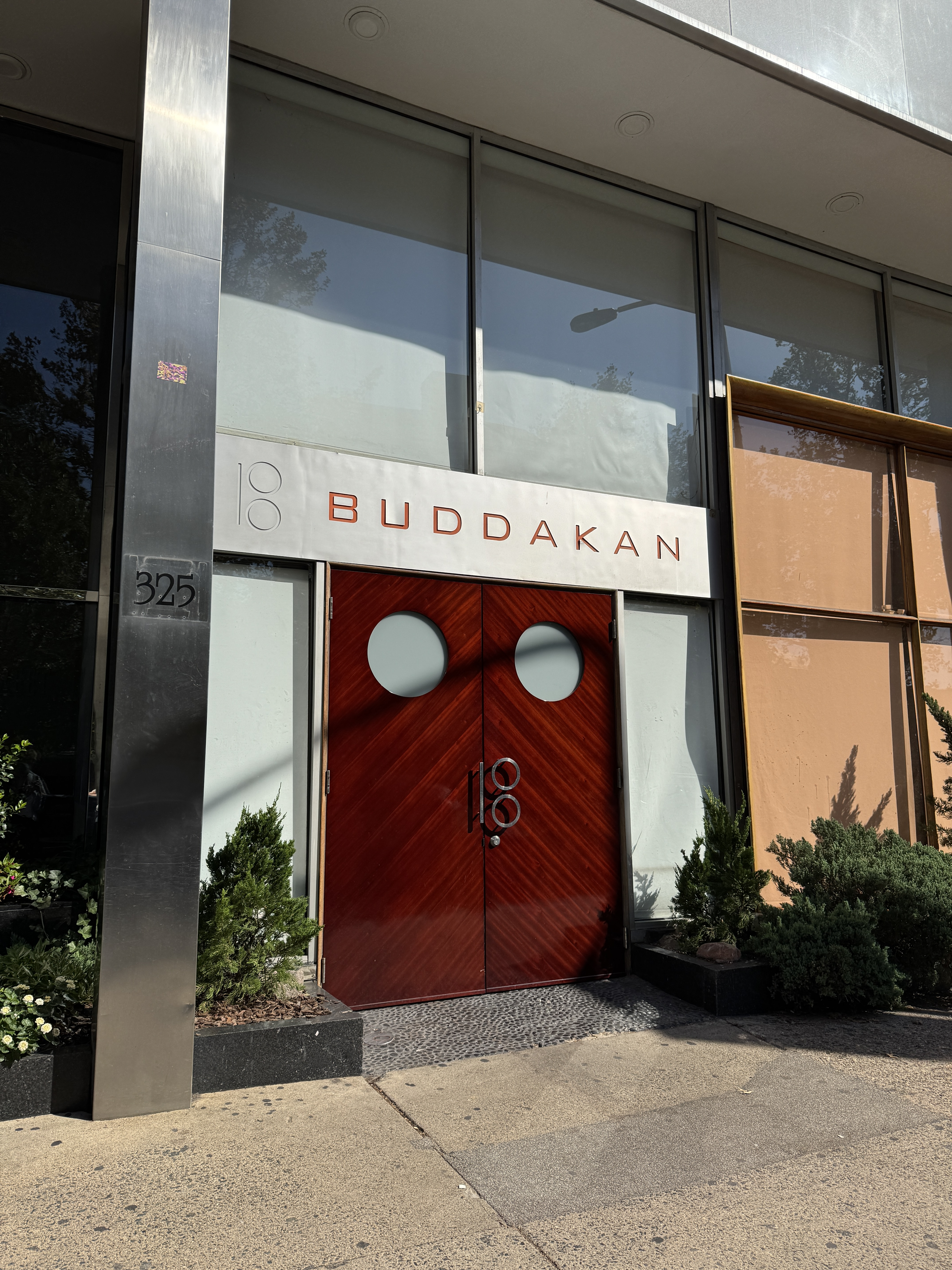
- Entrance to the Philadelphia Buddakan location
- Interactive map of Buddakan

Restaurant information
- Established: 1998
- Owner: STARR Restaurants
- Dress code: Casual
- Location: 325 Chestnut Street, Philadelphia, Pennsylvania, U.S., Philadelphia, Pennsylvania, 19106
- Other locations: New York City
- Website: www.buddakan.com

Buddakan is a restaurant chain serving Pan-Asian fusion cuisine owned by STARR Restaurants with locations in Philadelphia and New York City. A third location in Atlantic City, New Jersey closed in October 2020 due to the COVID-19 pandemic.

Stephen Starr opened the first restaurant in 1998 in Old City, Philadelphia.
