= 11 Woodfire =

Restaurant in Dubai, United Arab Emirates

- Interactive map of 11 Woodfire

Restaurant information
- Location: Villa 11 75B St – Jumeirah 1, Dubai, United Arab Emirates
- Coordinates: 25.21547°N 55.25159°E
- Reservations: Yes
- Website: 11woodfire.com

11 Woodfire is a restaurant by chef and owner Akmal Anuar in Dubai, United Arab Emirates. The restaurant has received a Michelin star. Time Out Dubai rated the restaurant 4 out of 5 stars.
