= Daniel Rose (chef) =

American chef

Daniel Rose is an American-born chef with restaurants in Paris and New York City.

== Career ==
Originally from Wilmette, Illinois, Rose moved to France for undergraduate studies at the American University of Paris. He spent a year at the Institut Paul Bocuse in Lyon. He apprenticed at the Bruneau Restaurant, a once three-star in Brussels, and worked at the luxurious Hotel Meurice with Yannick Alléno.

Rose opened his restaurant Spring in 2006 with 16 seats in the 9th arrondissement of Paris. It immediately drew enthusiastic reviews from the Michelin guide and Le Figaro, a leading French newspaper. Rose's approach is to use seasonal produce and cook for small groups, seeking to create a tranquil dining experience. In summer 2010, Spring relocated to a new location near the Louvre. The new space, located in the 1st arrondissement was almost 10 times the size of the previous location. Co-chef is Rose's wife Marie-Aude Mery.

In 2015, Rose opened his second restaurant, La Bourse et La Vie, a 29-seat eatery located between La Bourse and the Palais Royal, in the 2nd arrondissement of Paris, focusing on classic French bistro food. In April and May 2022, Rose changed the name of the restaurant to Le Borscht et La Vie and hired three Ukrainian refugees to create a Ukrainian menu. Part of the earnings was donated to a charity supporting those affected by the war.

In 2016, Rose acquired and re-opened Chez La Vieille, a historic restaurant across the street from Spring in Paris, which had been closed for several years.

Also in 2016, Rose partnered with Starr Restaurants to open his first restaurant in the United States, Le Coucou in SoHo, Manhattan in New York City. Le Coucou won the 2017 James Beard Foundation Award for Best New Restaurant in the nation. In 2018, Le Coucou was named No.85 on the list of The World's 50 Best Restaurants.

In 2017, Rose announced that he was closing Spring after ten years, continuing to run La Bourse et La Vie and Chez La Vieille in Paris but making his home in New York at Le Coucou.
