= Roman and Williams =

American design studio

- Type: Design studio
- Industry: Interior design, architecture
- Founded: 2002
- Founders: Robin Standefer; Stephen Alesch
- Headquarters: New York City, United States
- Services: Interior design; Set design; Architecture; Hospitality design

Roman and Williams is a design studio in New York City. It was founded in 2002 by Robin Standefer and Stephen Alesch.

== History ==
Ben Stiller hired the couple to design his Los Angeles home after working with them on the set of the film Duplex (2003), after which they decided to found their own design studio.

Named for the founders' maternal grandfathers, the firm opened its first office on the lot of Paramount Pictures. In 2004, it relocated to New York and established its office on Lafayette Street before moving to Canal Street in 2023.

Roman and Williams has designed homes for celebrity clients including Kate Hudson, Elisabeth Shue and Davis Guggenheim, and Gwyneth Paltrow.

Standefer and Alesch use their own homes in Manhattan and Montauk as design laboratories for future projects. The New York Times described their East Fourth Street apartment "an appealing hybrid, as if an apartment from the Apthorp had been reassembled by the furniture designers Pierre Chareau or Jean Prouve."

In 2011, Standefer and Alesch were recognized in Fast Company's list of "America's 50 Most Influential Designers." In 2014, they received the Cooper Hewitt, Smithsonian Design Museum's National Design Award for Interior Design. They won The Wall Street Journal's 2017 Innovators Award in the Design category, and the 2018 "Visionaries Award" from the Sir John Soane's Museum Foundation as well as an award for "Architecture" by Fashion Group International. The studio has been included in lists of the top design firms by Architectural Digest and Elle Decor.

The firm designed the goop mrkt pop-up store, and the HuffPost Live New York studio.

In 2016, Roman and Williams was commissioned to redesign the British Galleries at The Metropolitan Museum of Art, which opened in March 2020. This commission was the firm's first project in a museum. They were later commissioned to design an exhibition space for a special section of Frieze Masters 2023.

== Work for film ==
=== Robin Standefer film credits ===
Year	Film	Role
1989	New York Stories	Fine arts curator
1990	Goodfellas	Art department researcher
1991	The Rapture	Production designer
1992	Mac	Production designer
1993	The Age of Innocence	Video research consultant
1994	The New Age	Production designer
1995	Search and Destroy	Production designer
1996	The Pallbearer	Production designer
1997	Commandments	Production designer
1997	Addicted to Love	Production designer
1998	Illuminata	Production designer
1998	Practical Magic	Production designer
1999	The Invisible Circus	Production designer
2001	The Caveman's Valentine	Production designer
2001	Get Over It	Production designer
2001	Zoolander	Production designer
2002	The Guru	Production designer
2003	Duplex	Production designer

=== Stephen Alesch film credits ===
Year	Film	Role
1993	Matinee	Set designer
1994	Cabin Boy	Set designer
1994	New Nightmare	Set designer
1994	Stargate	Set designer
1995	Galaxis	Set designer
1995	Search and Destroy	Art director
1996	The Pallbearer	Art director
1997	Commandments	Art director
1997	Addicted to Love	Art director
1997	Gattaca	Set designer
1998	Illuminata	Art director
1998	What Dreams May Come	Set designer
1998	Practical Magic	Architectural consultant
1999	The Invisible Circus	Art director
2000	Gun Shy	Art director
2001	The Caveman's Valentine	Art director/visual consultant (New York)
2001	Get Over It	Art director
2001	Zoolander	Art director
2002	Issaquena	Production designer
2002	The Guru	Production designer
2003	Duplex	Production designer

== Bibliography ==
- Alesch, Stephen; Standefer, Robin; Brisick, Jamie; Stiller, Ben (October 16, 2012). Roman and Williams Buildings & Interiors: Things We Made. Rizzoli. ISBN 978-0-8478-3883-7.
- Hagberg, Eva (September 29, 2009). Dark Nostalgia. The Monacelli Press. ISBN 978-1-58093-232-5.
