= Food Paradise season 1 =

Food Paradise
- Season 1
- No. of episodes: 15

Release
- Original network: Travel Channel
- Original release: December 17, 2007 – April 26, 2008

Season chronology
- Next → Season 2

The first season of Food Paradise, an American food reality television series narrated by Mason Pettit on the Travel Channel, premiered on December 17, 2007. First-run episodes of the series aired in the United States on the Travel Channel on Mondays at 10:00 p.m. EDT. The season contained 15 episodes and concluded airing on April 26, 2008.

Food Paradise features the best places to find various cuisines at food locations across America. Each episode focuses on a certain type of restaurant, such as "Diners", "Bars", "Drive-Thrus" or "Breakfast" places that people go to find a certain food specialty.

== Episodes ==
=== Hamburger Paradise ===
Restaurant	Location	Specialty(s)
Louis' Lunch	New Haven, Connecticut	invented original hamburger sandwich in 1895 using vertical flame broilers
White Castle	(First) Wichita, Kansas (throughout U.S.)	famous 2 1/2 inch steamed sliders with chopped onions
All-American Drive-In	Massapequa, New York	old-fashioned classic "All American Burger"
Bob's Big Boy	Burbank, California	"Original Double Deck Hamburger" (2 patties), "Super Boy Big Combo"
World Famous Ted's Restaurant	Meriden, Connecticut	Steamed cheeseburgers with white cheese
Half-Moon Restaurant & Saloon - CLOSED	Kennett Square, Pennsylvania	Wild-game burgers (buffalo, ostrich, elk, antelope, wild boar and kangaroo)
The Spot Natural Food Restaurant - CLOSED	Hermosa Beach, California	Homemade veggie burgers
Pop Burger - CLOSED	(Lower West Side) New York City, New York	3 inch mini burger gourmet sliders
Old Homestead Steakhouse	(Chelsea/Meat Packing District) New York City, New York	$41 Kobe beef burger with exotic mushrooms and tater tots
Waylan's Kuku Burger	Miami, Oklahoma	Giant grilled burgers with buttered buns and any topping

=== Pizza Paradise ===
Restaurant	Location	Specialty(s)
Lombardi's Pizza Napoletant	(Little Italy) New York City, New York	Neapolitan-style thin-crust coal oven pizza, "Margerita"-cheese and sauce, famous pesto pizza
Ray's Pizza (on Prince St.)	New York City, New York	Original Ray's traditional thin-crust pizza
The Original Frank Pepe's Pizzeria Napoletana	("Little Italy" – Wooster Square) New Haven, Connecticut	New Haven-style coal fire oven pizza
Sally's Apizza Restaurant	New Haven, Connecticut	Coal fire New Haven-style pizza
Pizzeria Uno	Chicago, Illinois	Original deep dish pizza, "Numerio Uno" – cheese, sauce, sausage and pepperoni
Lou Malnati's Pizzeria	Chicago, Illinois	Deep dish pizza with buttery flaky crust, Wisconsin cheese and Illinois pork sausage, Chocolate chip pizza
Giordano's Famous Stuffed Pizza	Chicago, Illinois	Stuffed pizza Turino-style - 4 1/2-pound pizza pies with double crust, cheese on bottom and sauce on top
Caioti Pizza Cafe	Studio City, California	California-style gourmet pizza with unexpected toppings, "Pizza Rockafella"-seafood topped pizza
California Pizza Kitchen	Beverly Hills, California (1st), (Throughout U.S.)	Gourmet California-style pizza, Original Bar-B-Que chicken pizza
Nino's Bellissima Pizza	(Upper East Side) Manhattan, New York	"Luxury Pizza" - $1,000 gourmet pizza with crème fraîche, lobster tail, caviar and salmon roe

=== Hot Dog Paradise ===
Restaurant	Location	Specialty(s)
Nathan's Famous	Coney Island, New York	famous frankfurters (chili dogs, sautee onion & pepper dog), crinkle-cut fries, Nathan's Hot Dog Eating Contest
Pink's Hot Dogs	Hollywood, California	21 celebrity-named grilled hot dogs, chili cheese dogs
The Varsity	Atlanta, Georgia	World's biggest hot dog stand and drive-in, water-boiled hot dogs (chili dogs, chili slaw dog), onion rings,
Superdawg Drive-In	Chicago, Illinois	"Superdawgs" voted best Chicago hot dogs – (smokey & garlicky)
Hot Doug's The Sausage Superstore	Chicago, Illinois	Wild-game sausages sandwiches, corn dogs, "The Dog" – Chicago dog
Jimmy Buff's Hot Dogs & Sausages	East Hanover, New Jersey	Originators of the Italian hot dog (fried hot dogs with fried potatoes, onion & peppers stuffed into a roll
Franktitude	(Southbeach) Miami, Florida	Chilean-style seafood dogs, salmon franks, low calorie chicken/tofu franks

=== Steak Paradise ===
Restaurant	Location	Specialty(s)
Peter Luger Steak House	Brooklyn, New York	Dry-aged USDA prime beef, heavy-cut lamb chops
Hilltop Steak House CLOSED	Saugus, Massachusetts	Prime rib, Rib eye steak
Pat's King of Steaks	Philadelphia, Pennsylvania	Philadelphia cheese steak (chopped steak with Cheese Wiz)
Geno's Steaks	Philadelphia, Pennsylvania	Philadelphia cheese steak (sliced steak with provolone)
Cattlemen's Steakhouse	Oklahoma City, Oklahoma	USDA prime & choice steaks, (T-Bone Steak, "Cattlemen's Strip Sirloin")
Big Texan Steak Ranch	Amarillo, Texas	Big Texan Challenge: 72 ounce top sirloin, dinner roll, side salad, baked potato, and fried shrimp.
Buckhorn Exchange	Denver, Colorado	Wild game steaks: (buffalo, yak, elk, ostrich)
Megu	New York, New York	Kobe Chateaubriand and Kobe Filet Mignon

=== Donut Paradise ===
Restaurant	Location	Specialty(s)
Café Du Monde	New Orleans, Louisiana	beignets with powdered sugar, cafe au lait
Kane's Donuts	Saugus, Massachusetts	traditional cake- and yeast-style donuts; giant coffee rolls; full line of Kane's Gluten Free (KGF) donuts (14 daily flavors)
Randy's Donuts	Inglewood, California	50-foot ceramic doughnut-shaped sign, glazed, sugar and chocolate raised donuts
The Spudnut Shop	Richland, Washington	"Spudnuts" – potato flour donuts, "Nutty Spuddy", "Spufins" – potato flour muffins
Voodoo Doughnut	Portland, Oregon	"Voodoo Doughnut" – raspberry jam-filled voodoo doll-shaped doughnut, "Bacon Maple Bars", "Dirt Doughnuts", bubblegum doughnuts, "Dirty Snowball", "Memphis Mafia"
Top Pot Doughnuts	Seattle, Washington	old-fashioned spice cake doughnuts, maple doughtnuts, "Rainbow Doughnuts", "Pink Feather Boa" – pink icing with coconut
Doughnut Plant	(Lower East Side) New York City, New York	designer gourmet doughnuts, glazed doughnuts with edible flowers, raspberry glaze, doughnut jelly square, pistachio nut glaze

=== Barbecue Paradise ===
Restaurant	Location	Specialty(s)
Arthur Bryant's	Kansas City, Missouri	12-hour hickory & oak slow-smoked beef brisket, pork ribs with signature vinegar-based BBQ sauce.
Interstate Bar-B-Que	Memphis, Tennessee	Dry-rubbed brisket, pork ribs, chicken and sausage, one-pound pulled pork sandwich, "Barbecue Spaghetti" (seasoned rib meat mixed with BBQ tomato-based sauce over spaghetti)
Smitty's Market	Lockhart, Texas	Slow smoked brisket and signature smoked sausage.
Kreuz Market	Lockhart, Texas	Fast-smoked brisket, boneless beef shoulder, and smoked sausage.
Black's Barbecue	Lockhart, Texas	Smoked brisket, turkey, pork loin and beef ribs with signature BBQ sauce.
Annual Barbecue Festival	Lexington, North Carolina	Chopped or sliced pork shoulder in a ketchup & vinegar-based BBQ sauce called "Dip" served with cole slaw. Hot pork skins and barbecue turkey legs.
Lexington BBQ	Lexington, North Carolina	Lexington-style barbecue slow-smoked fire pit pork shoulders with vinegar-based BBQ sauce. Chopped pork sandwich served with "red slaw" (ketchup-based cole slaw), hush puppies and sweet tea.
Cowboy Flavor (Catering)	Santa Maria, California	Santa Maria-style "cowboy barbeque" (over an open firepit with red oak smoke) "Barbacoa", Beef shoulder, Linguica sausage served with pinto beans and salsa.
The Hitching Post	Buellton, California	"World's Best BBQ Steaks", Modern Santa Maria-style barbecue (vinegar & garlic-infused vegetable oil basted angus rib chops, prime top sirloin, filet mignon, grilled ostrich meat, barbecued artichokes with smoked tomato ancho-chili mayonnaise)
17th Street Bar and Grill	Murphysboro, Illinois	Award-winning barbecue (apple wood smoked), dry-rubbed pork ribs smothered with signature tomato & vinegar-based BBQ sauce and sprinkled with "Magic Dust" (secret seasoning)

=== Ice Cream Paradise ===
Restaurant	Location	Specialty(s)
Bassett's Ice Cream @ Reading Terminal Market	Philadelphia, Pennsylvania	America's Oldest Ice Cream Company - ice cream consisting of high butterfat content (makes it creamier) - Mint Chocolate Chip, Cookies and Cream, Cookie Dough, Peanut Butter, Butter Pecan, English Toffee Crunch
The Berkey Creamery	University Park, Pennsylvania	100 ice cream flavors, 10 frozen yogurt flavors and 6 sherbet flavors - "Alumni Swirl" (vanilla Ice Cream with Swiss mocha chips and blueberry swirl), "Pralines 'N Cream" (Praline flavored ice cream with praline pecans and caramel swirl)
Ben and Jerry's	Waterbury, Vermont	"Cherry Garcia" (cherry ice cream with cherries & fudge flakes), "Chunky Monkey" (banana ice cream with fudge chunks & walnuts), "Chubby Hubby" (fudge-covered peanut butter filled pretzels covered in vanilla malt ice cream swirled with fudge & peanut butter), "The Vermonster" (a huge ice cream sundae served in a bucket filled with 20 scoops of ice cream, 4 bananas, hot fudge, 3 chocolate chip cookies, a chocolate fudge brownie, walnuts, 4 choice toppings and whipped cream).
Doumar's Drive-In	Norfolk, Virginia	Creators of the ice cream cone - homemade Vanilla, Chocolate, Strawberry or Pecan ice cream inside a famous Doumar hand-rolled waffle cone.
Max and Mina's of Main Street	Queens, New York	Homemade Ice Cream & Ices (with eccentric experimental ice cream flavors) "Lox", "Corn on the Cob", "White Fish" (w/ vodka), "Cotton Candy (w/ marshmallows), "Halava", "Chocolate Cupcake", "Praline Pecan" "French Toast", "Garlic" and "Beer & Nuts".
Fair Oaks Pharmacy & Soda Fountain	Pasadena, California	Lime Rickey, Egg Creams, Milkshakes, ice cream sodas, "Classic Sundae" (ice cream sundaes w/ hot fudge, chopped nuts, whipped cream and a cherry), "All-American Banana Split" (a scoop of vanilla, chocolate & strawberry ice cream topped with hot fudge, strawberry & pineapple sauces with whipped cream, cherries and a split banana).
Serendipity 3	Manhattan, New York	"Strawberry Fields Sundae" (cheese cake, strawberry ice cream and strawberry topping and whipped cream), "Forbidden Broadway Sundae" (chocolate "blackout cake", ice cream, hot fudge topped with whipped cream), "Can't Say No Sundae" (humble pie, ice cream, banana and hot fudge with whipped cream), "Frrrozen Hot Chocolate" (frozen drink with 15 different blends of chocolate a topped with whipped cream), Guinness World Record "Golden Opulence Sundae" ($1,000 ice cream sundae with Tahitian Vanilla ice cream infused with Madagascar vanilla beans and edible gold leaf topped with Paris dried fruit, 23-karat gold-covered almonds, gold sugar flowers, passion fruit caviar and gold flakes served in an Amedei Porcelana & Venezuelan Chuao chocolate, 23K edible goldleaf-lined Baccarat crystal goblet eaten with an 18K gold spoon.

=== Diner Paradise ===
Restaurant	Location	Speciality(s)
Modern Diner	Pawtucket, Rhode Island	Breakfast Food - Custard French Toast topped with warm fruit and coconut shavings.
Rosie's Diner	Rockford, Michigan	Fried Bologna Sandwich, "Cobblestone French Toast", meatloaf sandwich served with mashed potatoes and gravy.
Empire Diner	New York, New York	Rail-car diner with a full bar – hamburgers, club sandwiches.
Ed Debevic's Diner	Chicago, Illinois	Cheeseburgers, cheese fries, milkshakes, pies. "Double-burger Special" (14 ounce beef patties)
Fog City Diner	San Francisco, California	Gourmet diner – mac n' cheese with ham & peas, Todo Santos Fish Tacos, Mu Shu Pork Burritos, Buffalo Burgers, truffle-oil fries, famous Bloody Marys, Dungeness Crab Ciopino, signature crab cakes.
Papermoon	Baltimore, Maryland	Breakfast quesadillas, "Cranberry Melt" (turkey with Swiss cheese and cranberry sauce on toast) "Mom's Meatloaf" (served with mashed potatoes and gravy), "David's Delight" (omelette stuffed with lox, cream cheese and capers)
Napa Valley Wine Train	Napa Valley, California	Seasonal Menu - Mahi Mahi Special with fresh vegetables paired with wine, braised short ribs with a Merlot sauce.

=== All You Can Eat Paradise ===
Restaurant	Location	Specialty(s)
Bellagio Hotel & Casino	Las Vegas	Bellagio Buffet (200 selections) suckling pig, Beef Wellington, sushi rolls, fish-smoked salmon roulade, Alaskan crab legs
The Broadmoor Hotel	Colorado Springs, Colorado	Gourmet Sunday Brunch (tapas, cheeses, desserts--chocolate fountain, chocolate showpieces)
The Castaway	Burbank, California	Sunday brunch (shellfish, shrimp, crab legs, sushi) full bar (Bloody Mary's & champaign), 25 different desserts
Gauchos Village	Glendale, California	"Rodizio"--Brazilian buffet ("pacana" - Brazilian grilled meat on skewers, empandas) Brazilian dancers
Pea Soup Andersen's	Buellton, California	All-you-can-eat "bottomless bowl" of split pea soup
Cafe Fleuri @ The Langham Hotel	Boston, Massachusetts	(September–June) "Chocolate Bar" – dessert buffet with 520 items (chocolate fantasies & chocolates of the world—chocolate soup, creme brulee, chocolate fountain, crepe station)
Denny's Beer Barrel Pub	Clearfield, Pennsylvania	World's largest hamburger, (1 to 15 pound burgers)

=== Sandwich Paradise ===
Restaurant	Location	Specialty(s)
Katz's Delicatessen	Lower East Side, New York City, New York	Pastrami on rye with mustard & Beef salami sandwich
Stage Deli	Midtown, Manhattan, New York	35 oversized celebrity-named sandwiches (classic pastrami)
Nardelli's Grinder Shoppe	Naugatuck, Connecticut	Italian Grinder sandwiches: "Meat Combo" (Three different kinds of meat)
Jersey Mike's Subs	Point Pleasant Beach, New Jersey	Submarine sandwiches ("Club Sub" with oil & vinegar)
Primanti Bros.	Pittsburgh, Pennsylvania	Italian-style meats, coleslaw & fries-stuffed sandwiches
Phillipe The Original	Los Angeles, California	French dip sandwiches (roast beef, lamb, pork, & turkey with au jus & spicy mustard)
Peanut Butter & Co. Sandwich Shop	Greenwich Village, New York City, New York	400 combos of peanut butter sandwiches (PB & Fluff, "Elvis"-PB, bananas, bacon, "The Pregnant Lady-PB & pickles)
Tony's I-75 Restaurant	Birch Run, Michigan	Over-sized BLT sandwich (World's biggest)

=== Ribs Paradise ===
Restaurant	Location	Specialty(s)
Nugget Rib Cook-Off	Sparks, Nevada	"Best in the West BBQ Rib Cook-Off" (every BBQ region is represented)
Famous Dave's BBQ and Blues	Minneapolis, Minnesota	Two-time BBQ pork ribs champion, "All American BBQ Feast" – ribs, chicken, corn bread, fries, corn on the cob and baked beans
New Zion Missionary Baptist Church Barbecue (aka: "Church BBQ")	Huntsville, Texas	"Devine Soul Food Ribs" – Oak wood-smoked dry rub secret seasoning barbecue ribs
Charles Vergo's Rendezvous Charcoal Ribs	Memphis, Tennessee	Charcoal longback rib racks (dry rubbed and basted) with vinegar solution and Greek seasoning
The Shed BBQ & Blues	Ocean Springs, Mississippi	Fall-off-the-bone BBQ baby back ribs and spare ribs (dry rub with brown sugar and secret sauce
Baby Blue's Bar-B-Q	Venice Beach, California	Soul Food, slow-cooked hybrid baby back BBQ ribs (dry rub marinade, smoked, grilled, and sauced), Memphis-style pork ribs, Texas-style beef ribs
Nancy's Pig Heaven	(Upper East Side) New York City, New York	(wet rub) Chinese spare ribs with Chinese red sauce (honey, five-spice powder, soy sauce, hoisin sauce, sherry and rice wine)

=== Steak Paradise 2: A Second Helping ===
Restaurant	Location	Specialty(s)
Gene & Georgetti Steakhouse	Chicago, Illinois	Wet aged beef (char-broiled 32 ounce T-bone), beef fat cottage fries
David Burke's Primehouse	Chicago, Illinois	40-day Himalayan salt cured dry aged free aged prime beef (hot rock skewers, Kobe beef sashimi)
The Palm Restaurant	(Midtown East) Manhattan, New York	28- to 35-day dry-aged beef, broiled steaks (New York strip)
Lawry's The Prime Rib	Beverly Hills, California	17 pound prime rib roast, spinning bowl farmhouse salad
The Grill House & Rock Bottom Bar	Allegan, Michigan	"Do-It-Your-Own Steakhouse"-pick out and grill your own choice meat, (only haunted steakhouse in U.S.)
Musashi Japanese Steakhouse	Las Vegas	Hibachi-grilled Kobe beef steaks
Bern's Steak House	Tampa, Florida	8-week dry aged beef, wine & steak (8 ounce Delmonico steak), world's largest wine selection of any restaurant (1/2 million bottles in underground wine cellar)

=== Bar Food Paradise ===
Restaurant	Location	Specialty(s)
Union Oyster House	Boston, Massachusetts	Blue point oysters on the half-shell, 5 to 16 lb lobsters, "clam chowda"
Jimmie Kramer's Peanut Bar	Reading, Pennsylvania	unlimited bowl of free peanuts
Restaurant Moderno	Piedras Negras, Mexico	created the original nachos with cheese & pickled jalapeños
J. Gilligan's Bar and Grill	Arlington, Texas	"Irish Nachos"-cottage fries, cheese, peppers, onions, jalapeño's served in a skillet
Finn McCool's Irish Pub	Santa Monica, California	Guinness beer, Loaded potato skins with Irish bacon & mushrooms
Barney's Beanery	West Hollywood, California	World-famous chili (on burgers, hot dogs, fries, hashbrowns), "Champaign Breakfast"-chili cheese dog with Dom Pérignon
Frank & Teressa's Anchor Bar	Buffalo, New York	World-famous original Buffalo wings with blue cheese dressing & celery
National Buffalo Wing Festival	Buffalo, New York	Hundreds of different kinds of chicken wings, plus wing eating contests

=== Breakfast Paradise ===
Restaurant	Location	Specialty(s)
The Machine Shed	Urbandale, Iowa	Farmhouse Breakfast (big portions): "Farmer's Daughter" & "Hungry Man's Breakfast", "I Love Eggs"-get a free egg, giant cinnamon rolls
Loveless Cafe	Nashville, Tennessee	South-style breakfast: hot biscuits and gravy & country ham with sorghum syrup
Pancake Pantry	Nashville, Tennessee	23 different kinds of pancakes: sweet potato pancakes
Petite Abeille	Lower East Side, New York City, New York	Belgian waffles: (Brussels waffles & Liege waffles)
Murray's Bagels	Greenwich Village, New York City, New York	Hand-rolled bagels: Lox & whitefish, "Leo" (Special)-lox, eggs, onions on salt bagel
Cereality Cereal Bar & Cafe	Santa Cruz, California	Create "Cereal-My-Way" with different kinds of combinations
Swingers	Santa Monica, California	Late-night organic breakfast: Huevos rancheros, pancakes, waffles, omelettes.

=== Deep Fried Paradise ===
Restaurant	Location	Specialty(s)
Willie Mae's Scotch House	New Orleans, Louisiana	Best fried chicken
Jive Turkey	Brooklyn, New York	Deep fried turkey, fried turkey sandwich
Goodson's Café	Tomball, Texas	The best chicken fried steak in Texas
Sodolak's Original Country Inn	Snook, Texas	Chicken fried bacon with cream gravy
Hollywood Café	Robinsonville, Mississippi	fried dill pickles, fried green tomatoes
Dyer's Burger	Memphis, Tennessee	Deep fried hamburgers and cheeseburgers in 100-year-old oil
Rutt's Hut	Clifton, New Jersey	Deep fried hot dogs with secret mustard relish
Chipshop	Brooklyn, New York	(Will fry up anything!) fish and chips, deep-fried Mars bars, deep-fried pizza
