= Bizarre Foods America =

- Genre: Food/Travel
- Starring: Andrew Zimmern
- Country of origin: United States
- No. of seasons: 6
- No. of episodes: 52

Production
- Executive producers: Colleen Needles Steward, Andrew Zimmern
- Editor: Tim Jones
- Running time: 43 minutes

Original release
- Network: Travel Channel
- Release: January 23, 2012 – May 26, 2014

Bizarre Foods America is an American television series, and a spin-off of Bizarre Foods, this time focusing on the United States rather than international travel. Andrew Zimmern travels to various cities throughout the country (as well as Canada, Colombia, and Peru) and samples local cuisines and ways of life. The show premiered on Monday January 23, 2012, at 9:00 ET on Travel Channel.

Much like in Bizarre Foods, Andrew heads to food hubs in the country. There he meets with locals and chefs to gain a better understanding of American cuisine, to explore how America has developed a reputation as a melting pot of cultures and foods, and to see what sort of foods are available in American cities.

Starting October 27, 2014 the show is returning to its original format as Bizarre Foods.

== Episodes ==
=== Season 1 ===
No.	Air dates	Location	Notes/featured bizarre foods
1 (1)	January 24, 2012	Twin Cities	Andrew visits a hotdish cook off, deep fried snapping turtle, elk kabobs, guinea pig confit cone, Jucy Lucy, Cajun Bluesy, duck nuts, butter burgers, making meals with meat glue, carp, Hmong cuisine including bitter bamboo soup, papaya salad at Hmongtown Marketplace.
2 (2)	January 30, 2012	New Orleans	"Swamp Food"; alligator; crawfish with "Cajun Napalm" boil; boudin; hog ponce; frogs legs; frog piquant; roux; rabbit; cracklings; Andrew participates in a New Orleans "Second Line" funeral procession; a visit to Willie Mae's Scotch House; gumbo; chicken creole; raccoon; turtle; cooking with jazz trumpeter Kermit Ruffins; a visit to the largest Vietnamese community in the South; jackfruit; boiled peanuts; b quan; tiet cahn aka Vietnamese pizza; Vietnamese hot pot.
3 (3)	February 6, 2012	Seattle	Andrew visits the world's famous Pikes Place Fish Market, a visit to a high-tech food lab. Pea butter, everything bagel soup, rare beef stew, geoduck, a visit to Sea Breeze Farms, fresh duck blood, duck liver, cow placenta, colostrum, making coffee using century old equipment and a $20,000 espresso coffee maker called "The Slayer", kim chi rice bowl, kabuki hot dog, Chinese BBQ pork dim sum, salmon collar, lychee bubble tea, cold jellyfish, ika shiukara, herring roe. Crispy potato vine with natto, a visit to FareStart restaurant training center. Sweetbreads, lamb kidneys, ox hearts.
4 (4)	February 13, 2012	Boston	Spiny dogfish fetuses, squid ink pasta, cannoli, salumi, coppa di testa, salchicche e rapè, skate, Cambodian rice porridge, praw-hak, Yao Hun, tripe salad, toasted silkworms, oysters, a seafood boil feast, a visit to a physics class at Harvard on food science, New England summer salad with chorizo powder, Arctic char, waygu, bone marrow custard, Boston style pizza.
5 (5)	February 20, 2012	Detroit	Deep South soul food, Peking duck, caramel cake, BBQ pig head, mower mani fore meatloaf, raccoon, kofta, kataif, kunufa, a Ramadan Iftar feast in Dearborn, spicy head cheese, pig's foot jelly, lamb kidney sub, dried fish pizza, ghost pepper pizza, bean custard pie, BBQ pig snouts, terrine, pizza Bismarck
6 (6)	February 27, 2012	West Virginia	Deer pluck, roast and heart, pepperoni rolls, squirrel stock, burgoo, groundhog, woodchuck cacciatore, picked ramps, corn fritters, a visit to the Pocahontas County roadkill cookoff festival featuring kettle corn, corn flakes cubes, walking tacos, mink chowder, turtle stew, hare, rabbit, asparagus and wild turkey stew, goat, squirrel and rabbit gumbo, smeared hog with groundhog gravy, crow cheese, beechnuts, corncob jelly.
7 (7)	March 5, 2012	Charleston	Tail terrine, chitterlings, lima beans, osawbwa, fried chicken skins, fried pigs ear, Carolina Cagbui trotters, Charleston gold rice, blood clams, microwaved clams, quail with okra, poor man's stew, chicken feet, mac and cheese, pig's feet, shrimp and grits, chicken bog, butter beans, Hughenot torte.
8 (8)	March 12, 2012	Savannah	Soul food Savannah-style, oxtails, red velvet cake with sour cream frosting, scuppernongs, seafood boil, a visit with Savannah's legendary The Lady Chablis, New South Kosher cuisine, pastrami and grit cakes, chopped liver and pastrami egg rolls, barbecued beef brisket blintz.

=== Season 2 ===
No.	Air date	Location	Notes/featured bizarre foods
1 (9)	July 9, 2012	Las Vegas	A Hamburger that costs five thousand dollars made with Kobe beef; a sundae that costs $1,000; cupcake that costs $750; tuna cones, artisan chocolates, how buffet leftovers become a feast at a pig farm in the outskirts of Las Vegas, a seafood restaurant that has an Italian fish market flown in every day; dinner for 1,800 people at Muhammad Ali's 70th birthday.
2 (10)	July 16, 2012	San Diego	Giant California Sea Urchin, spot prawns, Baja octopus, swordfish marrow with Yuzu and soy sauce, black cod foie gras, urchin gelato, tortas ahogadas, BBQ lamb Texcoco style, corn smut, fried crickets, pancita, a behind the scene visit to the San Diego Zoo during feeding time, Filipino comfort and street food, a visit to a camel dairy, foraging wild edible plants and abalone on the San Diego coastline .
3 (11)	July 23, 2012	Miami	Andrew explores the iconic treasures and hidden delights that make Miami's food scene special: A visit to La Caja China box roaster factory; Zimmern samples tambala cheese; guayaba; Cuban-style chicharrones; plantains; boiled yuca; papaya juice; stone crabs; Zimmern visits the Keys fishery, he samples Japanese waygu Beef; a steak that cost $400; a six-foot long Alaskan King Crab for $600; Zimmern visits the "sexiest ice cream trucks" in South Beach; he samples oyster sandwiches; a visit to the La Purisima Griteria celebration in Sweetwater's Little Managua; vigaron; Nicaraguan tamales; lengua; Nicaraguan shaved ice with dulce de leche; fish roe; bottarga; wahoo; cobia; wreckfish; caribbean reef octopus; a visit to Cobaya at the Mandarin Oriental Hotel, monstera fruit, panna cotta.
4 (12)	July 30, 2012	New Mexico	Prairie Dog roasted with cedar, Elk stew in red chile sauce, Green Zebra Tomatoes, a visit to the Earthship colony near Taos, Buffalo Pluck, Tia Sophia's Christmas style platters with red and green chile, tacos, menudo, green chile cheeseburgers, a mantaza celebration in Los Lunas, Sanguie Stew, carne avovada, chicharrones.
5 (13)	August 6, 2012	L.A. Pop Up	Andrew creates a menu inspired by his travels around the world for a hungry dinner crowd in LA.
6 (14)	August 13, 2012	Austin	Bloody Marys made with real blood, whole roasted pigeons, donuts topped with chicken and milkshakes made with bacon, venison lean tacos, scrambled pig brains, tortilla made with bacon fat, jar jar duck, lardo, trotter croquettes, wild boar tacos, Pon Haus, Texas style BBQ, food truck offerings from lamb hearts to yakitori.
7 (15)	August 20, 2012	The Blues Trail	Andrew tastes everything from southern staples like smoked baloney sandwiches, deep fried chicken livers, and pork rinds, to new spins on old staples, "Chinese chitlins", chicken skins, Chinese-style BBQ spare ribs, crawdads Cantonese, bean curd with seaweed, Venison pepper steak, pig ear sandwiches, Delta hot tamales, barbecue pork rib tips, catfish páté, "Smokes" sausage sandwiches, a visit to a Red's Blues Club & Juke Joint in Clarksdale, Mississippi.
8 (16)	August 27, 2012	The Other Florida	Frog legs; hunting armadillos; catching alligators, mud fish, garfish, Seminole cooking including water turtle, pumpkin fry bread, Indian burgers, sofkey, swamp cabbage, fiddlehead ferns.

=== Season 3 ===
No.	Air date	Location	Notes/featured bizarre foods
1 (17)	February 11, 2013	Washington D.C.	Fresh snakehead pulled from the Potomac; pupusas at a Salvadoran restaurant; peanut butter sandwiches made with foie gras, food trucks in Capitol Hill, a visit to a restaurant which serves historical foods from America's past, kosher soul food.
2 (18)	February 18, 2013	Denver	Rocky Mountain oysters at a ballpark; yak and elk served at an historic restaurant; pheasant cooked outside, Mongolian milk tea and dried curds,"Den-Mex" cuisine, Vietnamese style blood sausages, ant larva beignets. Note: this episode was dedicated to the memory of Greg "Cubby" Cabera.
3 (19)	February 25, 2013	Iowa	Pork brains with spring onion kimchi; a stew made from a sheep's head; roasted Iowa Swabian-Hall pigs; young Iowa Swabian-Hall pigs testicles, blood sausage; a visit to a chartreuse factory; janternice; head cheese; jellied tripe; a visit to a Sudanese neighborhood in Des Moines and participating in a Sudanese feast; ongfinch; kisra.
4 (20)	March 4, 2013	Alaska's Inside Passage	Fresh sea cucumbers; salmon eggs; fish heads that are buried before they're roasted over a fire; octopus; gumboots; kelp.
5 (21)	March 11, 2013	Wisconsin	Science behind what makes milk taste better; a traditional Serbian casserole made with lamb organs; emu testicles.
6 (22)	March 18, 2013	Chicago's Cutting Edge	A fish dish made with ambergris; charcuterie that includes duck heart pate; a soup that smells like a dead body; blood mortadella: blood morti sandwich pork pie: Korean flatfish; Boondae; "The Edible Campfire"; a visit to Supreme Lobster & Seafoods: frost fish Opah; sea lettuce;plankton; jade tiger;
7 (23)	March 25, 2013	Baltimore and Chesapeake Bay	Beef tongue sandwiches; Korean style soul foods that include boiled pig stomach (hog maw), cod sperm, cod roe, stewed pork intestines and blood sausage; traditional bay foods like barbecued baked muskrat and grilled eel (Maryland surf and turf); steamed blue crabs; a visit to the J.M. Clayton seafood packing plant; lake trout (aka late trout) fermented bean paste, fried seaweed, Army based stew, Korean barbecue, spicy pork belly, baby octopus, a visit to Five Seed Farms community farm, fig leaves, rockfish, fish peppers, Maryland hams, soft shell crabs, sorrel, leeks, strawberries, Andrew works alongside the Arabber fruit vendors of Baltimore.
8 (24)	April 1, 2013	The Ozarks	Fried rabbit legs; redhorse and northern suckerfish, Arkansas black bear cracklin's; bacon-wrapped crow breast, Vietnamese style fish fry, sour catfish soup, fish spring rolls, a squirrel cookoff in Bentonville, Arkansas.
9 (25)	April 15, 2013	Northern California	Grilled dove hearts; barf flavored jelly beans; monkeyface eel, California White Sage, poached dove breast, Buffalo Mozzarella, Birria de Chivo, Chicken Molé, a visit to the Jelly Belly jelly bean factory, baby wipes flavored jelly beans, red apple flavored jelly beans, rotten egg flavored jelly beans, booger flavored jelly beans, earwax flavored jelly beans, limpets, cabazon, lamb, mutton sheep heart ragout.
10 (26)	April 22, 2013	Portland	Elk heart tartare with a raw turkey egg; bourbon smoked cherries and bone barrow; goose liver with cacao; honey made from beehives from local back yards; honey lavender ice cream; fermented salami; salt cured hogs; lardo; a visit to an exotic salt shoppe; bourbon cured pigeon crudo; wagashi; Hanabira; chocolate foie gras bars; chocolate with chicharrones and peppers; foietella; a visit to an urban farm.

=== Season 4 ===
No.	Air date	Location	Notes/featured bizarre foods
1 (27)	July 1, 2013	Hidden Los Angeles	Grunion hunting on Venice Beach; smoked ox tongue; a visit to an urban ranch in a Compton neighborhood; carnitas; tortitas de Camaron; fried dough sticks; rice porridge with 1,000-year-old eggs, Hakka cuisine; Hunan cuisine, Shumai style BBQ, stinky tofu; faux meats and seafood made with vegetable protein; chicken and guerrero style pig head tamales at a food truck in Watts; Hawkins House of Burgers famous Whipper Burger; chicken and waffles; Cambodian rice porridge, fish amok, steamed chicken embryo (Balut) during a Cambodian New Years celebration in Long Beach, home of the largest Cambodian community in the United States; wild wood sorrel, wild mustard greens, beef brisket with korbucha, pear tart with sorrel curd.
2 (28)	July 8, 2013	Undiscovered Hawaii	Dried octopus bile sac; crispy pork intestine; a raw fish salad that includes the eyeballs, poke, palu, octopus liver, crack seed, sesame fjish, Icee with Li Hing Mui juice, "Larry" size Hawaiian shaved ice, helmet urchin, taro.
3 (29)	July 15, 2013	Third Coast: Stingrays, Swamp, and Swine	Stingray tacos; skate; sheepshead; butterfly ray; cow-nose ray; pan fried duck testicles; nutria stew, wild feral hog, Vietnamese cooking including fermented mullet; bângcChung, a visit to Chapapeella Farms, Isleño cuisine including boudin sausage, pulldoo gumbo, arroz con pollo, oysters.
4 (30)	July 22, 2013	Queens N.Y.: World's Best Food Town	A Pakistani kebab joint with a dish made out of goat liver and brains; a Tibetan place with Ghili Gasa soup made from yak meat; buffalo chicken feet with maple syrup; lamb face noodles; lamb heads; longevity noodles; chop-chop bread; Gola Yogi Oshi; Samsa; "Star of David" bread; Oshi Saro; istrian style pancetta; Tarska bacon; Kransja sausage; Kata-Kat; Tampa Gee; Suku; blood pancake; bone marrow soup; sweet potato noodles; Muslim lamb chops; Sago sweet soups.
5 (31)	July 29, 2013	Birmingham: The New South	A Chinese style noodle bowl made with frog legs and pig skin; sautéed rabbit offal and goat head soup; hickory smoked fried chicken with white sauce; pine needle meringue, bullfrog heart with pea shoots; a visit to a sea urchin lab at the University of Alabama-Birmingham and how "urchin chow" is made; octopus; shrimp and grits Greek style; soul food including neck bones, slippery cabbage with okra, ox tails, collard greens, turnip greens, rutabagas and succotash; made from scratch banana pudding; Alabama bobwhite quail with blood sauce.
6 (32)	August 5, 2013	Rhode Island: Chowing Gaggers & Stuffies	New Englanders blend old traditions and experimental to create clam cakes and monkfish liver mousse, gagah, coffee milk, chili cheese fries, a visit to the Pawtucket Winter Farmers Market, sea scallops, sea robins, fig bars, oysters, Stuffies, fish roll, codfish, a visit to the Culinary Arts department at Johnson & Wales University, papo sec, Azores style chorizo, baclabo.
7 (33)	August 12, 2013	Louisville: Bourbon And Burgoo	A beverage that tastes like bourbon but without the alcohol; barbecued mutton, fried bologna sandwiches with chili and spaghetti, frog legs, grilled goose breast with Kentucky sorghum, egg drop soup, tobacco chocolate cookies, burgoo, squirrel, Watergate salad, soy sauce made in bourbon barrels, premium Kentucky ham, pork brain sandwiches, fried hominy, carrot marmalade.
8 (34)	August 19, 2013	St. Croix, USVI: Bull's Feet In Paradise	Goat water soup; conch roti; guinea almond, breadfruit tostones, Senepol cattle, land crabs, shellfish, pate, sweet potato dumplings, bull's feet soup, pickled green bananas.
9 (35)	August 26, 2013	St. Louis: Pig Snouts & Paddlefish	Pork brain sandwiches with marble rye bread, crispy pig snouts aka "Snoots", pig heart pastrami; dessert made with organ meats and caramel sauce, St. Louis style pizza with provel cheese, St. Louis ooey gooey butter cake, paddlefish, Burek, Sac, Cevapi.
10 (36)	September 2, 2013	Houston: Blast and Cast	Buffalo; fresh duck organs; grilled redfish; a restaurant that serves up Viet Cajun crawfish, tailgating with fans of the Houston Texans professional football team, Texas "T" Wagyu beef, Machitos, barbacoa, Mangulita pig leg, oysters Gilhooey, Indian sweets, making by-catch fish into cuisine.

=== Season 5 ===
No.	Air date	Location	Notes/featured bizarre foods
1 (37)	November 4, 2013	New Jersey: Pigs Blood & Paprikash	Filipino favorites like dinuguan, turban, sisig, lechon and balut to the Taylor pork roll to triploid oysters and other dishes like scungilli, conch, ocean whelks, a visit to the Hungarian festival in New Brunswick, ramen, fluke, Taylor pork roll, chicken paprikash, grilled duck hearts.
2 (38)	November 11, 2013	Pittsburgh: Catfish & Kiska	Blending old and new food traditions; stuffed cabbage; braunschweiger; goat heart tartare, riverside catfish fishing at the Allegheny river near PNC Park, sfoglitelle, rhemer's blennd, Primanti's sandwich, Vietnamese banh mi, trout, drinking vinegar, heart tartar with celery foam.
3 (39)	November 18, 2013	Virginia: Cicadas & Cownose Rays	Andrew Zimmern finds out that in Virginia, people aren't afraid to shake up tradition when it comes to food.Chinese Mystery Snails city pigeons, cow nose rays, croakers, Virginia Hams, Surryano Hams, Dandoodles, Berkshire Hams, a visit to the U.S. Navy newest ship the USS Arlington and how they feed 800 crew members on the ship's mess hall, cicadas, peanut soup, a visit with Peter Chang, considered as one of America's best Chinese food chefs, bamboo fish, Grandmother's Lobster, Beggar's Duck, Mala Rabbit.
4 (40)	November 25, 2013	Toronto: Horse Heart & Flipper Pie	Horse heart salami; seal flipper pie; pig's ear and cuttlefish, Singapore slaw, Chinese sausage, Malay style noodles, a visit to a traditional Chinese medical shop disguised as a frozen yogurt shop, soursop, durian, grouper, eel with black bean sauce, pea meal bacon sandwich, a visit to the Festival of South Asia, curry goat, paan, papadatum, chakri, samosas, cod cheeks and tongue, hard bread, britches (fried cod roe), screech (a type of Jamaican Rum.
5 (41)	December 2, 2013	Cleveland: Pighead & Perch	Pigs head, perch, souse, deep fried hot dogs, Polish Boy sandwiches, A visit to a Friday night fish fry at the American-Slovak Club in Lorain, Hurka, tailgate mustard, wet aged and dry aged beef, Denver steak, vegetables that are grown underground. oyster leaf, diver's grass, popcorn shoots.
6 (42)	December 9, 2013	NYC Overnight: Bizarre at All Hours	Halal, naan, dal, braised goat's head, chicken and pork tamales, menudo, chicken feet in hot sauce, rabbit in green chili, doctor fish, blood cockles, uncut beef, dry aged beef, Al Chigae/Jjigae, Budae Chigae /Jjigae (Army stew), Haejang Guk (hangover curing stew). sesame leaf, raw marinade crab, pork belly and squid marinaded in chilli (chili) sauce, green tea muffins, chocolate miso brownies, organic ice cream, lox.
7 (43)	December 16, 2013	Minnesota State Fair: Curds, Corn & Cracklins	Tom Thumb donuts, mini cinnamon rolls, foot long hot dogs, malts, The Gizmo, double bacon corn dogs, comet corn, deep fried pickles, fried pickled and chocolate, dough-sant, peach glazed pig cheeks, cracklings with Alabama style white sauce, roasted corn, cheese curds, a visit to the baking, canning and pickling competition and the livestock competition at the "MNSF", goat cheese, goat meat, Texas dry rub BBQ, pork tamales, lefse, Swedish egg coffee, smelt, walleye on a stick, chocolate chip cookies.
8 (44)	December 23, 2013	San Francisco Bay: Cricket Cookies & Engineered Eggs	Cookies made with crickets; a visit to the Hampton Creek Foods/Beyond Eggs laboratory and creating eggs and mayonnaise substitute out of plants; lamb's head soup; leopard sharks with grounded sea beans and Bull head kelp pickles; bat rays; fermented uni; fermented three year old fish: 1, 10 and 32 year old chili paste; Nuka; kasu sake; pickled sun choke, pumpkin and burdock;ox penis soup; Oaxaca chapulin tacos; bun bo hue; marinated baby octopus with fresh wasabi; rundi; yakatori; toffee flavored mealworms; bolani; pacha; falooda with rose water sweet noodles and pistachios

=== Season 6 ===
No.	Air date	Location	Notes/featured bizarre foods
1 (45)	March 24, 2014	Alaskan Wilderness: Moose Fat & Muskrat	People hunt and gather foods to get them through the long cold winter in Copper River Valley and In the remote region of Chistochina. Moose Bone Marrow, Porcupine, Labrador Tea, Dinesse, Fermented Salmon Head oil, Moose Fat, Spruce Chicken, Soss, Moose Head Soup.
2 (46)	March 31, 2014	Vancouver: Box Crabs & Bull Kelp	Box crab and bull kelp; blood sausage made with pig heads (boudin noir); a visit to Rainforest Cannery the largest tuna cannery in North America; spot prawns; humpback prawns; side stripe shrimp; Giant Pacific octopus; Dungeness crabs; king crabs; ling cod; California Roll; Golden Roll sushi; tarpon: salami with seaweed: coppa infused with sake; sea lettuce; masutake mushrooms; rock weed; sea beans; Coho salmon; a visit to the Richmond Night Market at Vancouver's Asiatown featuring Takoyaki, pork and kimchi dumplings, Northwestern Chinese BBQ and squid tentacles.
3 (47)	April 7, 2014	Nashville: Crane Meat & Pigeon Feet	Hot chicken, dry ribs, grilled Sandhill crane, squash casserole, turkey feet broth, ramen with hot fried chicken and pickles, Nashville style BBQ, Kurdish cuisine including roasted lamb, currant juice, Arum, Kari and Kurdish dumpling soup, duck egg omelet, hot chicken skin with sorghum molasses, pigeon foot jerky, Ancient White Park beef.
4 (48)	April 14, 2014	Dallas: Red Meat & Rattlesnakes	Andrew visits the Metroplex, Deep South and east Texas style BBQ cow head roasted underground (South Texas barbacoa); sweetbreads, chorizo tacos; a visit to a master gunsmith in Fort Worth; moronga; machito; fermented duck eggs; tom yum with chicken feet; giant water bugs; nam prick kampi; stink beans with sautéed shrimp; venison; goat meat stew (Birria de Chivo); a visit to a Russian banya; zakuski; samsa; herring in a fur coat; Russian pickles.
5 (49)	April 28, 2014	Cartagena, Colombia: Jungle Rats & Reptiles	Land turtle and shark, viseras desertores salpicón de toro, cocada de panuela, arepas, patacons, mamona (suckling calf), ñence, cartenaja caiman, patacon con toro, mamona, local sweets and treats, locu toro prieiro, Libranche, Jackfish stew, Macabi, Pompano, Sargo.
6 (50)	May 5, 2014	Lima, Peru: Frog Shakes & Fish Sperm	Frog and toad smoothies with honey, quail eggs, bee pollen, maca and alfalfa pollen; giant Amazonian river snails; fried guinea pig; kingfish, tochos, blood bark, anticuchos, chifa, frogfish, okayu with fish sperm, "new age" sushi, nigiri with aji armadillo límon sauce, scallops, ceviche ( misspelled as "serveche"), fried fish eggs, leche de Tigre, piache, armored catfish, manioc aka aji negro, octopus, chicken foie, pekin cuy, quail eggs: antichucos.
7 (51)	May 19, 2014	Atlanta: Monkfish Liver & Goat Heart	A visit to the Buford Highway Farmers Market the largest farmers market in the South, Bigos, Polish Hunter Stew, Sundae, Japanese Squid Jerky, monkfish liver with ponzu, goat's neck, goat heart, goat fries, brisket infused with miso, coppa with Korean chili, kimchi bologna, kimchi stew, bran flake peanut butter French toast with caramelized bananas, a visit to a Korean bathhouse with Margaret Cho, a visit to a cake sculptor who uses bizarre flavors.
8 (52)	May 26, 2014	Florida Keys: Horse Conch and Hogfish	Iguanas, Stone Crab Claws, iguana Eggs, Lionfish cerviche, a visit to a lionfish fishing tournament, sea cucumbers, Jack crevalle, Lookdown/Atlantic Moonfish, bar jack/yellow jack, Cuban style coffee, Buchis, Cuban style sandwiches, a visit to a Cuban cigar factory in Key West, Majua chips, Camarones y Langostas Enchilados (spicy shrimp and lobsters), horse conch, oysters, hogfish, key lime pie.
