= Thacker Mines, West Virginia =

Thacker Mines
- Unincorporated community
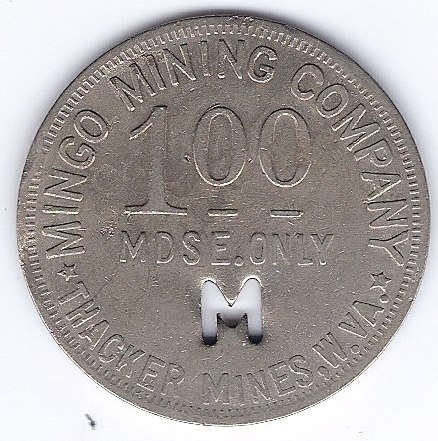
- Coal scrip from Thacker Mines, West Virginia

- Location within the state of West Virginia
- Coordinates: 37°36′13″N 82°5′48″W
- Country: United States
- State: West Virginia
- County: Mingo
- Elevation: 974 ft (297 m)
- Time zone: UTC-5 (Eastern (EST))
  - Summer (DST): UTC-4 (EDT)
- FIPS code: 1555797

Thacker Mines is an unincorporated community and coal town located in Mingo County, West Virginia. Their post office has been closed.
