= Peter Chang (chef) =

American chef

Peter Chang 张鹏亮
- Born: 1963 (age 62–63); Hubei, China
- Spouse: Lisa Chang
- Culinary career
- Current restaurant(s): Peter Chang's China Grill, Charlottesville, VA (opened March 2011) Peter Chang China Café, Short Pump, Virginia (opened February 2012) Peter Chang Restaurant, Williamsburg, VA (opened September 2012) Peter Chang's China Café, Fredericksburg, Virginia (opened May 2013) Peter Chang's China Bistro, Virginia Beach, Virginia (opened December 2013) Peter Chang's China Café, Arlington, Virginia (opened March 2015) Peter Chang's China Bistro, Rockville, Maryland (opened April 2015) Peter Chang Richmond, Scott's Addition Historic District, Richmond, Virginia (opened summer 2016) Q by Peter Chang, Bethesda, Maryland (opened May 2017) Peter Chang's, Stamford, Connecticut (opened September 2018) Mama Chang, Fairfax, Virginia (opened February 2019) NiHao, Baltimore, Maryland (opened July 2020) Chang Chang, Washington, DC (opened October 2022) Peter Chang Baltimore, Baltimore, Maryland (opened June 2023) NiHao Arlington, Arlington, Virginia (opened April 2024)
- Previous restaurant(s): Peter Chang College Park, College Park, Maryland (August 2025 - May 2026) China Star, Fairfax, Virginia (2005) TemptAsian, Alexandria (February 2006 - May 2006) China Gourmet/Szechuan Boy, Fairfax, Virginia (May 2006 - July 2006) Tasty China, Marietta, Georgia (September 2006 - 2007) Hong Kong House, Knoxville, Tennessee (2008) Taste of China, Charlottesville, Virginia (2009 - 2010) Tasty China, Atlanta (2010)
- Website: http://www.peterchangarlington.com/

Peter Chang (simplified Chinese: 张鹏亮; traditional Chinese: 張鵬亮) is a Chinese chef specializing in Sichuan cuisine who is known for his restaurants in Virginia and other states in the Southeastern United States.

== Early life and emigration to America ==
Chang was born in 1963 in a farming village Hubei Province, attending culinary school in Wuhan. He was assigned to work on a cruise ship on the Yangtze river, where he met his wife, Lisa. After working in luxury hotels and winning national cooking competitions in China, Chang was encouraged to take the foreign service cooking test, earning a two-year contract to work in the Embassy of China in Washington, D.C.

Chang and his family arrived in the United States in 2001, and during his tenure at the Chinese Embassy he cooked for then-Vice President Hu Jintao. One morning in 2003, just days before they were set to return to China, the Chang family left the embassy with plans to settle in the United States.

== Disappearances and movement ==
A map, captioned "The restless chef," accompanying a 2012 Washington Post article about Chang has arrows indicating Chang's movements between cooking positions in ten southeastern U.S. locations in a period of about eight years. It shows a journey from the Chinese Embassy in Washington, D.C., to suburban Richmond, via the Virginia suburbs of Washington, suburban Atlanta, Knoxville, and Charlottesville.

After leaving the Chinese Embassy, Chang became the chef at a Chinese restaurant, China Star, in Fairfax, Virginia. To avoid Chinese bureaucrats and U.S. immigration officials, he worked under a pseudonym, "Mr. Liu." The restaurant had a typical menu of American Chinese cuisine, but there was also a Chinese language menu with more sophisticated Sichuan cuisine.

Chang was discovered by users on the DC-area food website DonRockwell.com and by Washington City Paper food critic Todd Kliman, and the increasing publicity led Chang to leave China Star for TemptAsian in Alexandria, Virginia. After a review was published in the City Paper in 2005, Chang left TemptAsian for a new restaurant in Fairfax called Szechuan Boy. Kliman wrote a review of the new restaurant in Washingtonian magazine, which prompted Chang to leave Virginia altogether.

In September 2006, users on Chowhound found Chang working at Tasty China in Marietta, Georgia. The chef was gone by the spring of 2007, but in June 2008 he was found working at Hong Kong House in Knoxville, Tennessee. In the fall of 2009, Chang moved to Taste of China in Charlottesville, Virginia, which quickly became a popular destination, with lines extending out the door.

The March 2010 issue of The New Yorker featured an article by Calvin Trillin entitled "Where's Chang?", chronicling the chef's movements, Kliman's reviews, and interviewing John Binkley, a retired Washington economist who had eaten at each of Chang's restaurants and become friends with the Chang family. The article brought national recognition to Chang and Taste of China; and by the end of the month he had left the restaurant, citing differences with the owner.

Chang was seen at Tasty China in Georgia in late March 2010, and that December he opened Peter Chang's Tasty China II in Sandy Springs, in northwest Atlanta.

== Stability and expansion ==
In March 2011, Chang opened Peter Chang's China Grill in Charlottesville, partnering with Gen Lee, a Chinese chef and restaurateur who had met Chang while running a sandwich shop next door to Taste of China. Chang and his wife were able to obtain authorization from immigration authorities to work in the United States, and the opening of China Grill marked the end of Chang's saga of short-lived stays in restaurant kitchens.

Lee and Chang opened Peter Chang China Café in Short Pump, a suburb of Richmond, Virginia in early 2012. In 2012, China Café was named by Bon Appétit as one of the 50 Best New Restaurants in America.

In September 2012, Chang opened Peter Chang Cafe in Williamsburg, Virginia on Richmond Road, near the campus of The College of William and Mary. In May 2013, Chang opened Peter Chang's China Cafe in Fredericksburg, Virginia in the Central Park Shopping Center.

On March 14, 2015, a restaurant bearing his name opened in Arlington, Virginia's, Lee Harrison Shopping Center. He also opened a restaurant in Rockville, Maryland in the Town Square Plaza on April 15, 2015.

On June 5, 2016, Chang opened a new eponymous restaurant in the Scott's Addition Historic District of Richmond.

The series of restaurants described above, opened since 2010 in partnership with Gen Lee, are now known as "Peter Chang [location]." The group's website lists seven locations: Arlington, Charlottesville, Fredericksburg, Short Pump, Virginia Beach, and Williamsburg, Virginia; and Rockville, Maryland.

In May 2017, Chang opened a new restaurant in Bethesda, Maryland, Q by Peter Chang, at 4500 East-West Highway, with a "grand opening" scheduled for June 2, 2017.

In March 2018, Chang opened a restaurant in the Stamford Town Center Mall in Stamford, Connecticut. He opened it in partnership with Bill Xia, a Connecticut businessman who had suggested Stamford as the location of Chang's first northeastern location.

In March 2019, Chang opened a new restaurant in Fairfax, Virginia, Mama Chang, featuring recipes by Chang's wife and his mother. Mama Chang reportedly welcomed 1,000 diners per day on its opening weekend. In May 2019, the Washington Post's restaurant critic, Tom Sietsema, ranked Mama Chang as #1 on his list of the year's 10 best new restaurants in the Washington area.

In July 2020, Peter and Lisa Chang opened NiHao, in Baltimore.

In October 2022, Chang opened Chang Chang, in the Dupont Circle neighborhood of Washington, D.C., his first restaurant in the District of Columbia.

In May 2024, Chang opened a second iteration of NiHao in Arlington, Virginia's Crystal City neighborhood.

In August 2025, Chang opened Peter Chang Kitchen & Bar in College Park, Maryland.

== Awards and media ==
Chang was a finalist for a James Beard Award in 2016 for Best Chef, Mid-Atlantic. He has cooked several times at the James Beard House in New York City, including for a dinner in November 2019 celebrating "The Chang Mystique."

In November 2013, China Cafe in Richmond was featured on Andrew Zimmern's show Bizarre Foods America on the Travel Channel. In July 2016, Peter Chang in Rockville was featured on the Food Network's Top 5 Restaurants with Sunny Anderson and Geoffrey Zakarian.

A December 2019 article in The Economist on Chinese-American cuisine opened "For several years, beginning in the mid-2000s, devotees of Chinese food on America's east coast obsessed over a mystery: Where was Peter Chang? A prodigiously talented—and peripatetic—chef, Mr. Chang bounced around eateries in the south-east." It described one of his soups, with pickled mustard greens and fresh sea bass, as "in its way as hauntingly perfect and austere as a Bach cello suite."

October 2023, Peter Chang's restaurant Chang Chang was added to the Michelin Guide for DC . "Named for owner and well-known local chef Peter Chang, this Dupont Circle dweller has a sleek, minimalist aesthetic with a plush look and feel. The kitchen echoes the stylish look with elevated takes on classic Chinese dishes."
