= Food Paradise season 2 =

Food Paradise
- Season 2
- No. of episodes: 5

Release
- Original network: Travel Channel
- Original release: November 24 – December 22, 2010

Season chronology
- ← Previous; Season 1 Next → Season 3

The second season of Food Paradise, an American food reality television series narrated by Mason Pettit on the Travel Channel, premiered on November 24, 2010. First-run episodes of the series aired in the United States on the Travel Channel on Mondays at 10:00 p.m. EDT. The season contained 5 episodes and concluded airing on December 22, 2010.

Food Paradise features the best places to find various cuisines at food locations across America. Each episode focuses on a certain type of restaurant, such as "Diners", "Bars", "Drive-Thrus" or "Breakfast" places that people go to find a certain food specialty.

== Episodes ==
=== Bacon Paradise ===
Restaurant	Location	Specialty(s)
All Good Cafe	Dallas, Texas	Thick-sliced Wright's peppered bacon
Slater's 50/50 Burgers by Design	Anaheim, California	"The 50/50 Burger"-50% ground beef 50% ground bacon (topped with fried egg, pepper jack cheese, avocado & chipotle mayo), "Peanut Butter & Jealousy Burger", bacon milkshakes, bacon brownies
3 Bar & Grill	Arlington, Virginia	Own spice-cured smoked bacon, bacon-wrapped pork chop with bacon cornbread, "Heritage Hog"-pig roast
The Lido Deck	Newport Beach, California	Homemade pig and lamb bacon, wild boar bacon with soft-boiled egg on top, elk burger with wild boar bacon
Bad Decisions Bar	(Fell's Point) Baltimore, Maryland	Happy hour bacon cocktails (all drinks served with a side bowl of fried bacon)
Hash House A Go-Go	San Diego, California	Bloody Mary BLT, "Hair-of-the Dog" – 24 ounce beer served with honey-cured smoked bacon, "BBBLT"-triple the bacon, lettuce & tomato
Martini's at the Beach	Santa Cruz, California	World's biggest BLT sandwich (oversized sandwich piled high with bacon)

=== Food Truck Paradise ===
Restaurant	Location	Specialty(s)
Uncle Gussy's Traditional Greek Cuisine	(51st St. & Park Ave.) New York City, New York	Gyros, Souvlakis, Greek salads
Flying Pig Healthy Taste	(Washington Blvd.) Los Angeles, California & (Sunset Blvd. & Cole Ave.) Hollywood, California	French-Asian tacos (gua-bao & sliders)
The Grilled Cheese Truck	East Los Angeles, Los Angeles, Hollywood & Venice Beach, California	"Cheesy Mac 'n' Rib" (macaroni and cheese & BBQ rib meat grilled cheese sandwich)
Ali Baba's Turkish Kebabs @ Food Cart Pods (parking lot)	(10th St. & Alder St.) Portland, Oregon	Lamb and rice kebabs
The Dump Truck @ Food Cart Pods	Portland, Oregon	Dumplings (bacon cheeseburger dumplings)
Saucy's BBQ @ North Station Pod	(2800 North Greeley Ave. & North Killingsworth St.) Portland, Oregon	Sweet-sauced BBQ pork ribs
Whiffle's Fried Pies @ Cartopia Food Pod	(SE Hawthorne Ave. & SE 12th St.) Portland, Oregon	Famous fried fruit pies
Pyro Pizza @ Cartopia Food Pod	Portland, Oregon	Stone-oven baked thin-crust pizza pies
Potato Champion Belgian Fries @ Cartopia Food Pod	Portland, Oregon	"Pomme Frites"-Belgian fries (cheese curds & gravy fries, peanut butter & jelly fries)
Mr. C's Grease Truck @ Rutgers University campus	New Brunswick, New Jersey	Grease Truck food, "Fat Sandwiches" – 8-inch overstuffed sandwiches with meats, fries, sauces, and cheeses (famous "Fat Darrell", "Fat Cat") Fat Sandwich Challenge
Fojol Bros. of Merlindia: A Traveling Culinary Carnival	(Logan Circle Park @ Rhode Island Ave. & 14th St.) Washington D.C.	First performance food truck, Indian food (chicken curry, mango lasse popsicles)
Roman Chewing Candy	(5510 Constance St.) New Orleans, Louisiana	Horse drawn cart, Roman candy sticks (vanilla, chocolate & strawberry taffy-like candies)

=== Deep Fried Paradise 2: Extra Crispy ===
Restaurant	Location	Specialty(s)
Acme Oyster House	New Orleans, Louisiana	Fried oysters, po' boys, "Boo Fries" – cheese fries with gravy, oyster challenge (15 dozen in 8 minutes)
Ye Old King's Head Pub	Santa Monica, California	British chip shop (fish 'n' chips)
Montgomery Inn: The Ribs King	(Montgomery suburb) Cincinnati, Ohio	fried Saratoga chips (aka potato chips)
Fletcher's Corney Dogs @ Fair Park Fairgrounds	Dallas, Texas	"Texas State Fair Fried Food Competition" (corn dogs)
Clark's Outpost Bar-B-Q	Tioga, Texas	Deep fried corn-on-the-cob, "Lamb Fries" – lamb testicles
No Name Pub	Big Pine Key, Florida	Deep fried conch fritters
Kushiage Dining Horon	Torrance, California	"Kushiage"-Japanese panko-fried meat or seafood skewers, "Do-It-Yourself Mashed Potatoes"
Cafe Coyote	Old Town, San Diego, California	Deep fried ice cream

=== Pasta Paradise ===
Restaurant	Location	Specialty(s)
Patsy's Italian Restaurant	New York City, New York	Frank Sinatra's NYC favorite, Neapolitan cuisine: Linguine in calm sauce, veal Milanese
Filomena Ristorante	Washington D.C.	Handmade pasta: gnocchi, spinach and cheese ravioli
Fior d'Italia Restaurant	San Francisco, California	Northern Italian cuisine, pumpkin ravioli
S'MAC	(East Village) Manhattan, New York	12 different types of macaroni and cheese served in a sizzling skillet
Marino Ristorante	Hollywood, California	Sinatra approved, homemade Italian food: "Spaghetti Ala Vongole"
La Dolce Vita Restaurant and Bar	Beverly Hills, California	Sinatra approved, table-side service: pasta, veal, fish and lobster
Lasagna Ristorante	Chelsea, Manhattan, New York	17 different kinds of baked lasagna

=== Pie Paradise ===
Restaurant	Location	Specialty(s)
Mom's Pies Etc.	Julian, California	Homemade apple pies and apple crumble
Blue Owl Restaurant & Bakery	Kimmswick, Missouri	"Levee-High Apple Pie" – apple filling piled high under pie crust
Dooky Chase's Restaurant	New Orleans, Louisiana	Famous sweet potato pie
Tuck Shop: The Great Aussie Bite	(East Village) New York City, New York	Australian meat pies (beef pies)
Kermit's Key West Key Lime Shoppe	Key West, Florida	Key lime pie, chocolate covered key lime pie slice on a stick
Dangerously Delicious Pies	Baltimore, Maryland	"Baltimore Bomb Pie" – cookie pie with vanilla cheese filling, "Mobtown Brown"- pecan pie with Swiss chocolate & caramel
House of Pies Coffee Shop	(Los Feliz Village) Los Angeles, California	Strawberry cream pie, glazed fruit pies
