= Acme Oyster House =

Seafood restaurant in New Orleans

Coordinates: 29.95429°N 90.06894°W

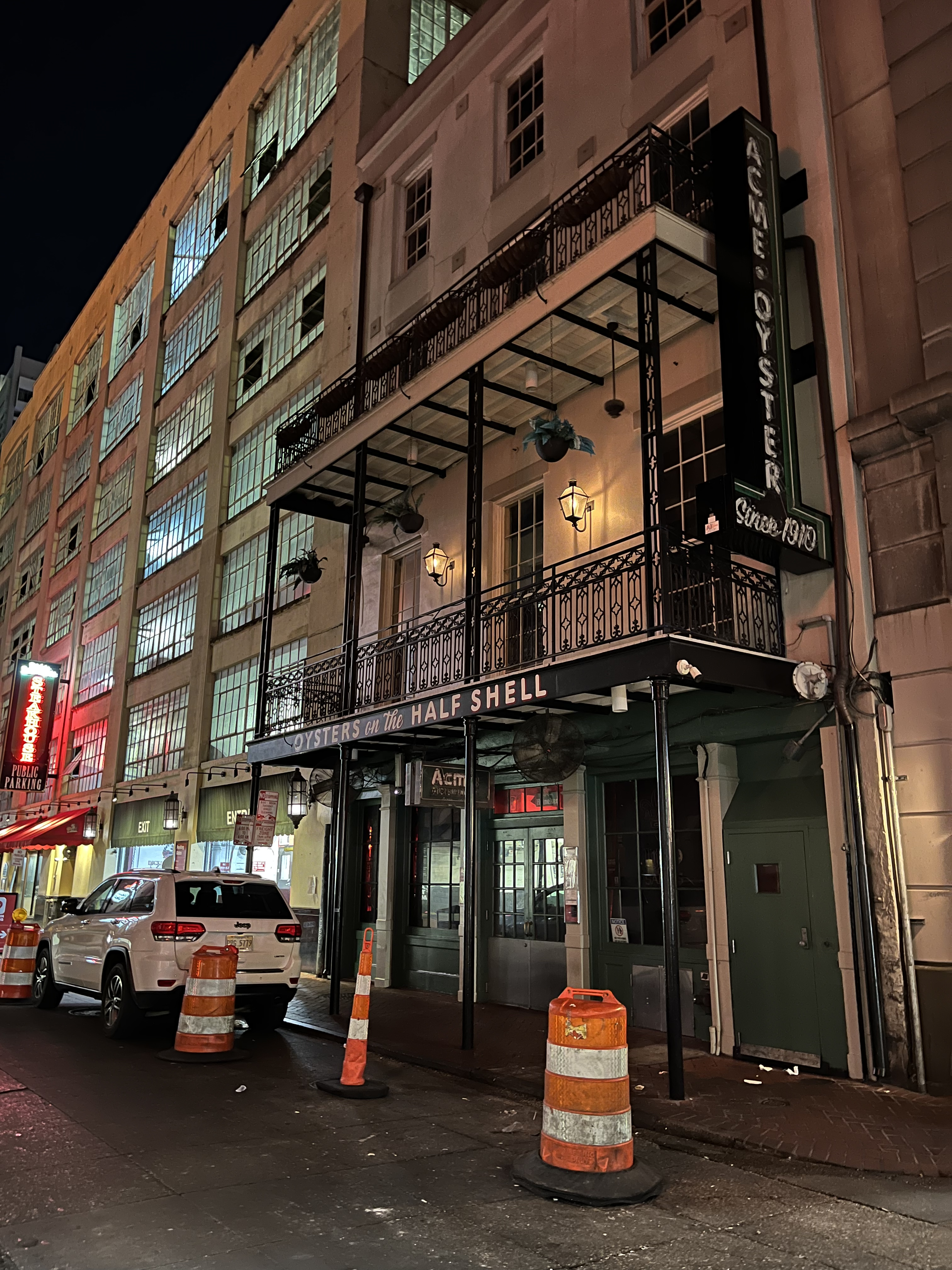
- Acme Oyster House in the French Quarter, New Orleans
- Interactive map of Acme Oyster House

Restaurant information
- Food type: Seafood
- Location: Metairie, Louisiana, United States

Rawbar Inc., doing business as Acme Oyster House, is a chain of seafood restaurants in the United States, headquartered in Metairie, Louisiana, with the original in the French Quarter of New Orleans. The company's food is served cajun and creole style and it has locations in Florida, Alabama, and formerly Texas.

Its dishes include oysters, po boys, jambalaya, etouffee, and gumbo.

In 2005 the French Quarter restaurant did not book reservations. Clea Simon of the Boston Globe wrote that the French Quarter facility "looks more like a bar than a restaurant".

== History ==
Acme was founded in 1910 as the Acme Café.

In 2005 it had plans to open a location in the Biloxi Hard Rock Hotel & Casino in Biloxi, Mississippi.

In 2010 the company began pursuing opening a location in Houston. The location in Montrose, Houston opened in April 2021, and closed in December 2023. It was in the former Tower Theatre, which was established in 1936 and later housed a theatre, a nightclub, a movie rental business, a Tex-Mex restaurant before becoming an Acme location. This was the first Acme location that has stopped operations.

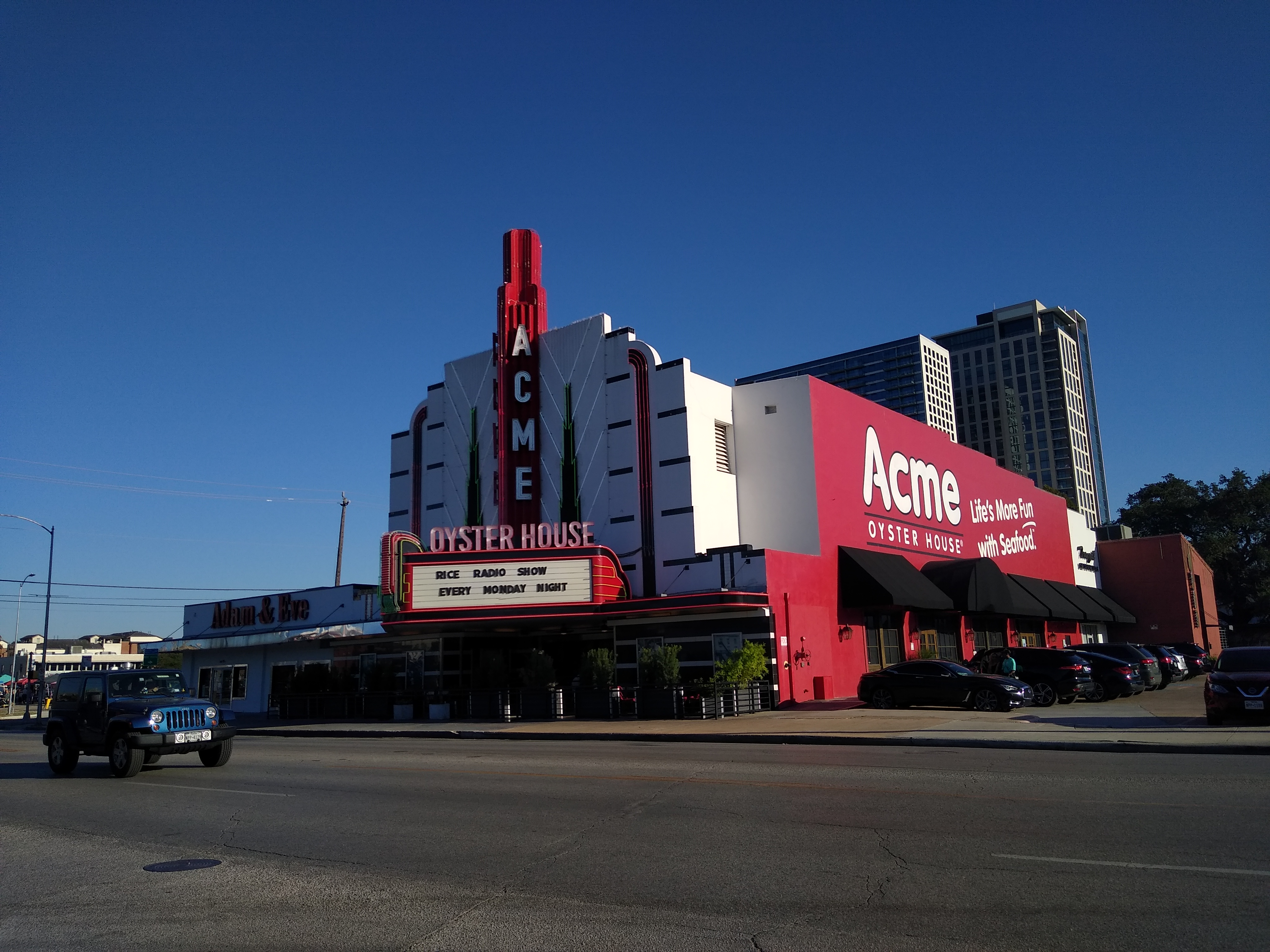
Location in Montrose, Houston

== In popular culture ==
Acme appeared in Man v. Food (season 1). Adam Richman’s challenge was to join the 15 Dozen Club. They also appeared on Food Paradise (season 2).
