= Willie Mae's Scotch House =

Restaurant in New Orleans, Louisiana, U.S.

Coordinates: 29°58′09″N 90°04′44″W

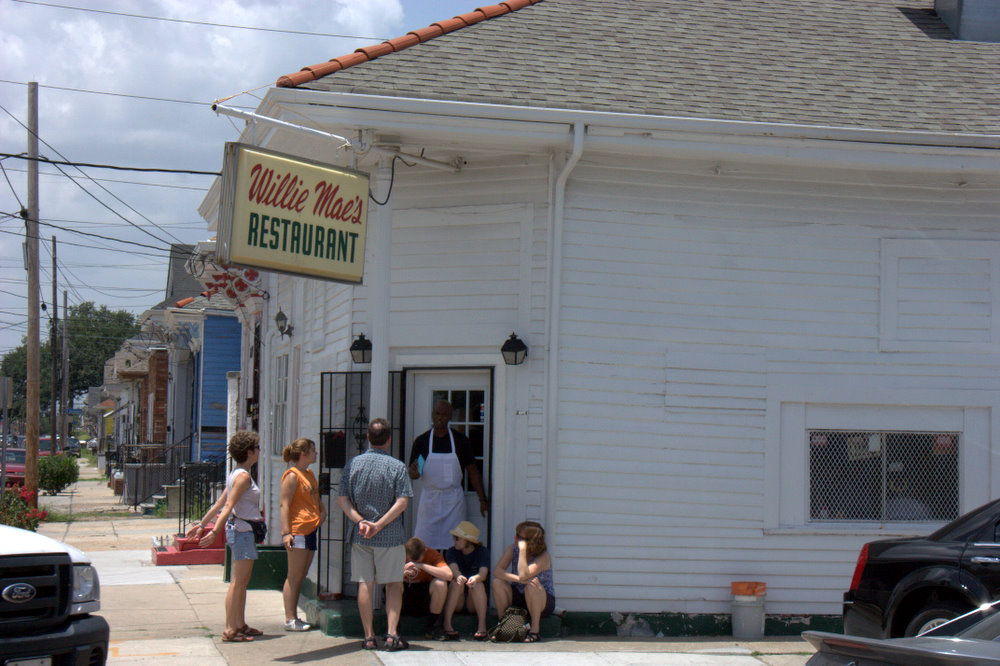
Willie Mae's Scotch House

Willie Mae's Scotch House is a restaurant in New Orleans, Louisiana. In 2005 it was named an America's Classic by the James Beard Foundation.

== History ==
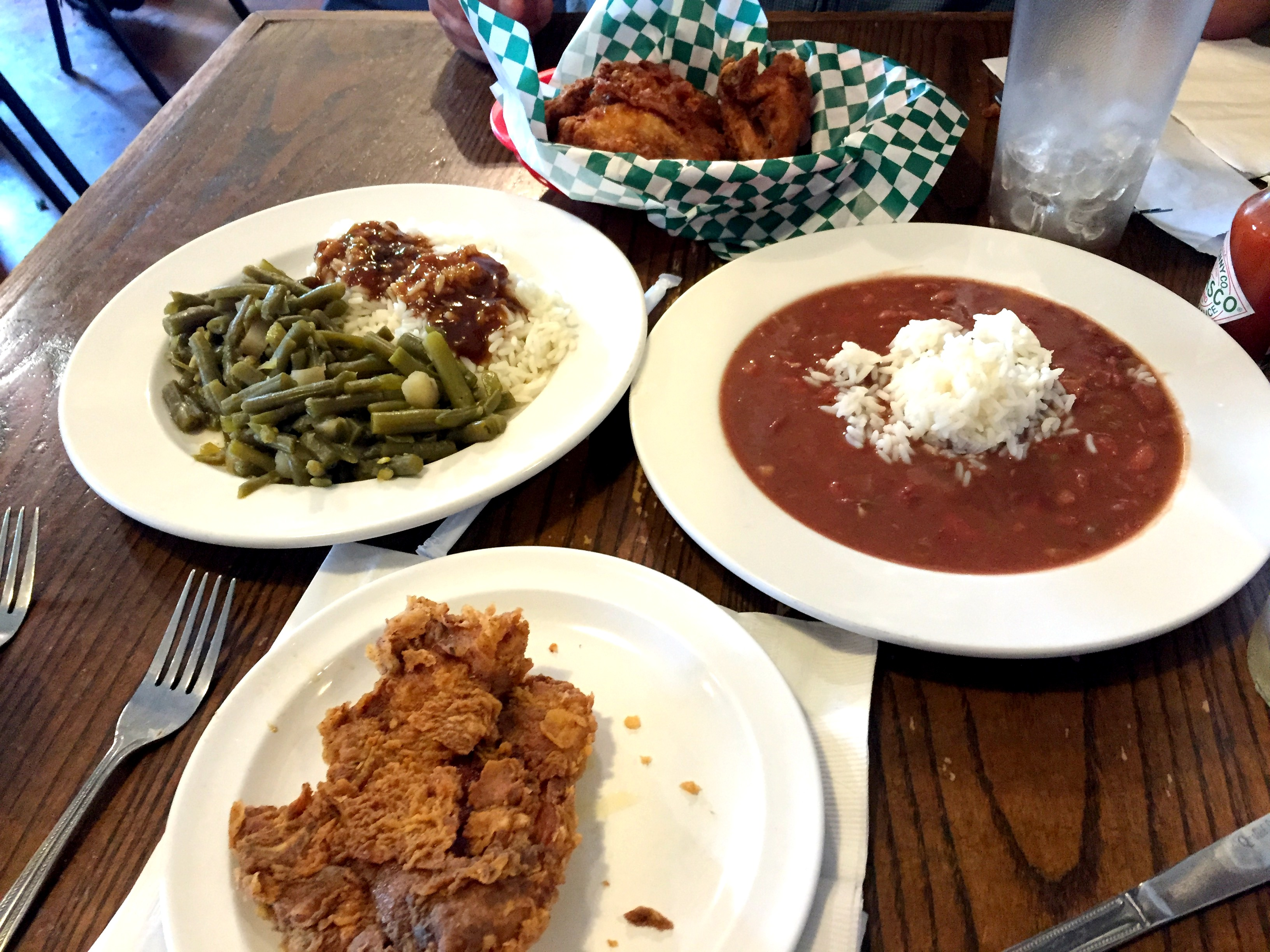
Fried chicken, red beans and rice, country-fried pork chop and green beans and rice

Originally opened in 1957 in the Tremé neighborhood by Willie Mae Seaton operating as a bar, beauty shop and restaurant. After one year to their current location at 2401 St. Ann Street in the 6th Ward. They sustained significant damage during Hurricane Katrina but were able to reopen in 2007. As of 2019 it is run by Willie Mae's granddaughter Kerry Seaton Stewart.

In 2014, Seaton-Stewart opened a second location in the Uptown neighborhood. In 2022, they announced they would be opening a location in Los Angeles.

== Ownership ==
The restaurant was originally owned by Willie Mae Seaton, who was born in 1916 in Crystal Springs, Mississippi. After Seaton died in 2015 the restaurant was taken over by her great-granddaughter Kerry Seaton Stewart.

== Awards and honors ==
- 2005, James Beard Award for "America's Classic Restaurant for the Southern Region",
- 2008, first season of Food Paradise
- 2012, featured on Bizarre Foods America
- The Food Network and the Travel Channel named them "America's Best Fried Chicken"
