= Company scrip =

Scrip issued by a company to pay its employees

Scrip used by Olga Coal Company, Coalwood, West Virginia

Company scrip is scrip (a substitute for government-issued legal tender or currency) issued by a company to pay its employees. It can only be exchanged in company stores owned by the employers. In the United Kingdom, such truck wage systems have long been formally outlawed under the Truck Acts. In the United States, payment in scrip became illegal in 1938 as part of the Fair Labor Standards Act. However, there are claims that scrip was still used until the 1960s, for example in plantations in Alabama.

In the United States, mining and logging camps were typically created, owned and operated by a single company. These locations, some quite remote, were often scarce in cash. Even in ones that were not, workers who were paid in scrip had little choice but to purchase goods at a company store, as exchange into currency, if even available, would exhaust some of the value via the exchange fee. With this economic monopoly, the employer could place large markups on goods, thus making workers dependent on the company, and thus enforcing a form of loyalty to the company. While scrip was not exclusive to the coal industry, an estimated 75 percent of all scrip used was by coal companies in Kentucky, Virginia, and West Virginia.

== Lumber company scrip ==
In 1800s United States forested areas, cash was often scarce and difficult to obtain. This was particularly true in lumber camps, where workers were commonly paid in company-issued scrip rather than government issued currency.

In Wisconsin, for example, forest-products and lumber companies were specifically exempted from the state law requiring employers to pay workers' wages in cash. Lumber and timber companies frequently paid their workers in scrip which was redeemable at the company store. Company-run stores served as a convenience for workers and their families, but also allowed the companies to exploit workers for increased profit. In certain cases, employers included contract provisions requiring employees to patronize the company stores. Employees who wanted to change their scrip to cash generally had to do so at a discount.

Lumber company scrip was redeemable in lumber as well as other merchandise. According to the Wisconsin Historical Society, such an option may have appealed to new settlers in the region, who worked in the lumber camps in winter to earn enough money to establish a farm. Taking some of their wages in lumber may have helped them build a much-needed house or barn.

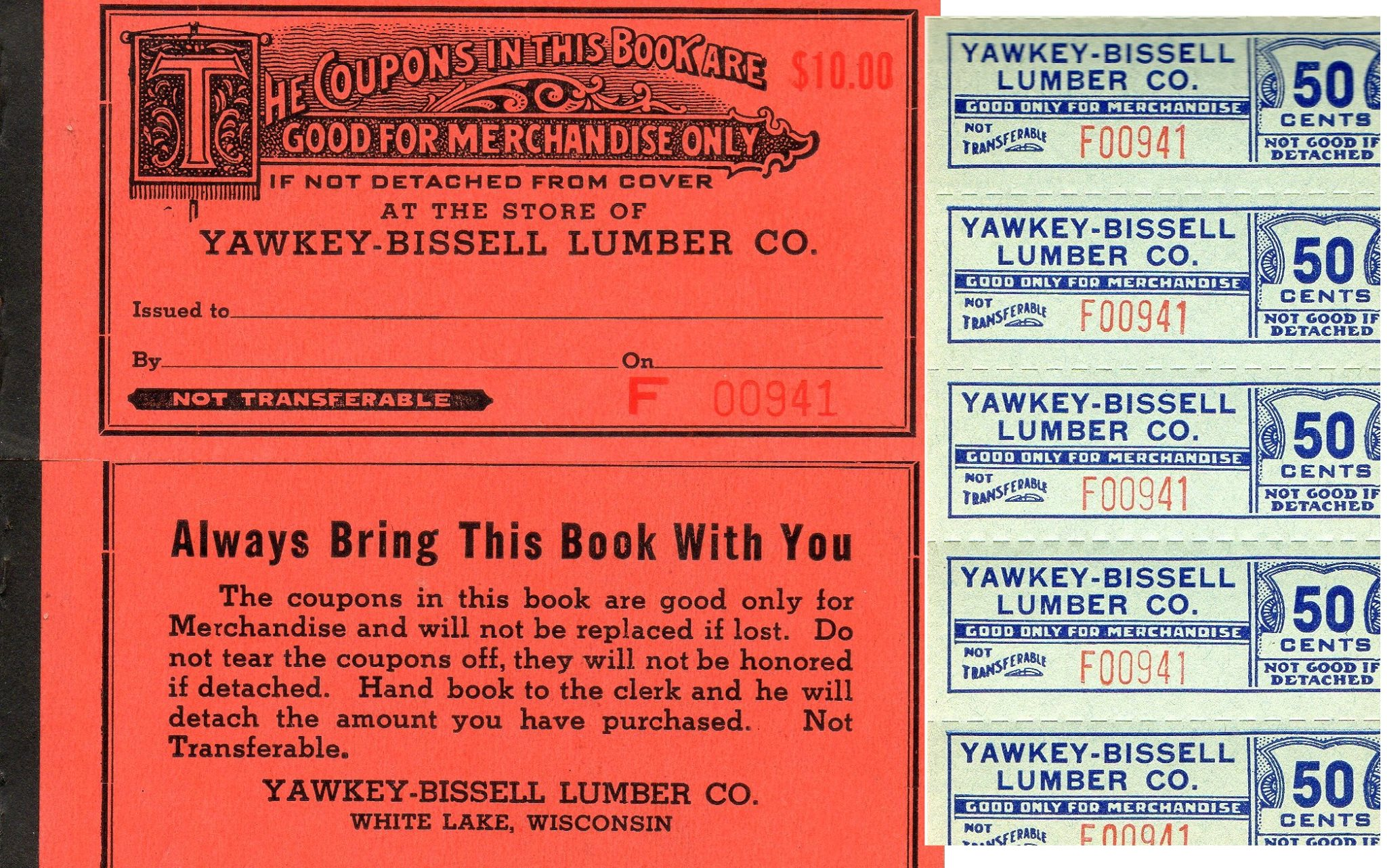
Yawkey-Bissell Lumber Company Scrip for White Lake, Wisconsin

== Copper company scrip ==
Poker chips, also referred to as casino tokens, are commonly used as money with which to gamble. The use of chips as company money in Devon, England during the early 1800s in the Wheal Friendship copper mine inspired the name of a local village, Chipshop.

== Coal company scrip ==
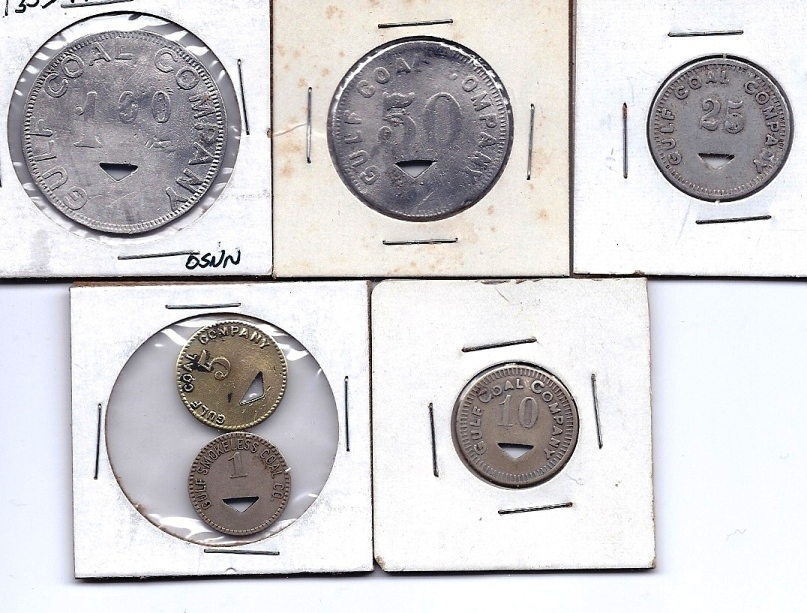
Various forms of coal scrip

Coal scrip is "tokens or paper with a monetary value issued to workers as an advance on wages by the coal company or its designated representative". As such, coal scrip could only be used at the specific locality or coal town of the company named. Because coal scrip was used in the context of a coal town, where there were usually no other retail establishments in that specific remote location, employees who used this could only redeem their value at that specific location. As there were no other retail establishments, this constituted a monopoly. The coal town was established by out-of-state corporations and fueled by cheap labor provided by European immigrants who came to Appalachia in search of work in the growing coal industry.

The use of coal scrip dates to the late 1800s as coal companies looked for a way to increase their profits (although the stated reason for using scrip was to eliminate keeping large cash reserves). Rather than receiving compensation in United States currency, many miners received payment entirely in scrip, which could be used only at a store owned by the coal company (called a company store). Coal companies would also advance miners their wages in scrip, but would pay from 50% to 80% of their wages for such advances (a form of early payday loans). The result was a situation in which miners were perpetually in debt to their employer, receiving only an "advance against unearned wages." Moreover, because the company store was often the only place to spend scrip, the company could charge exorbitant prices in these rural communities compared to prices in major cities.

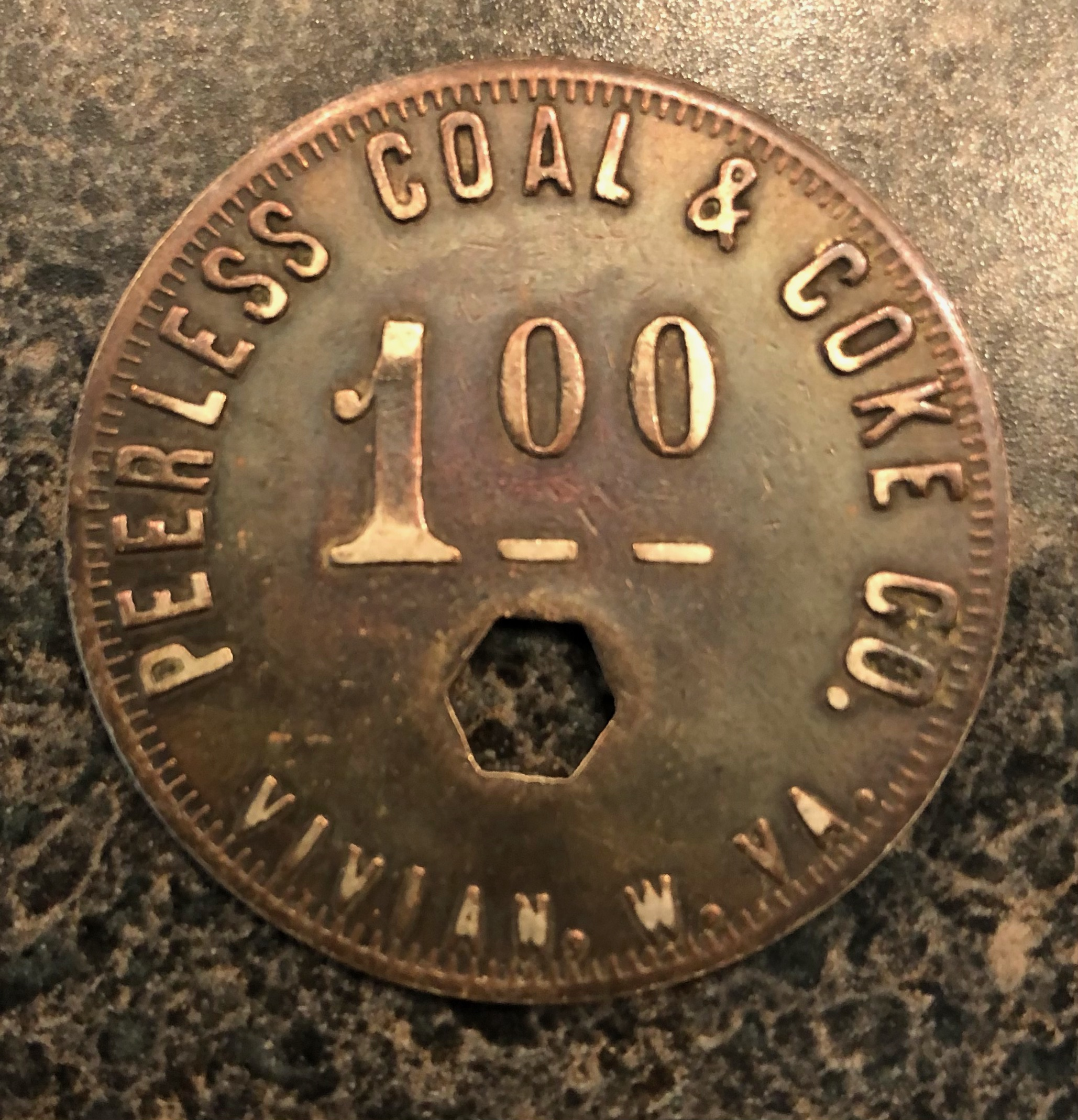
$1 scrip coin from Peerless Coal & Coke Co., Vivian, West Virginia

There was no uniform design, but each coin generally identified the location of the coal company town and predominantly featured the words "non-transferrable" to communicate to recipients it could not be transferred for U.S. currency.

Coal scrip was deemed unconstitutional if non-transferable in the early 1900s, but continued to exist in Kentucky and West Virginia until officially outlawed by Congress in 1967.

The country musician Merle Travis, on the album Folk Songs of the Hills, makes reference to coal scrip in the song "Sixteen Tons", made famous by Tennessee Ernie Ford.

== Plantation scrip ==
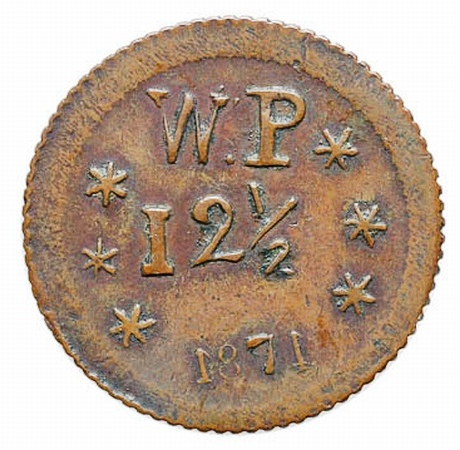
Coin worth 12 1/2 cents issued to workers on sugar plantations in Wailuku, Hawaii in the 1800s; this was a day's wage and could only be spent in company stores.

Plantation scrip incorporated cards, coins or tokens issued to sharecroppers and other workers on former plantations after the American Civil War. It could only be spent at the plantation store, which often had inflated prices, and made saving up money to leave the plantation almost impossible. In 1887, thousands of sharecroppers and sugar workers went on strike in order to receive money payments instead of scrip; this escalated into violence and dozens of African Americans were killed in the Thibodaux massacre. The use of scrip continued into the 1900s; in 1965, Martin Luther King, Jr. spoke of meeting plantation workers who had been paid in scrip all their lives and "had never seen U.S. currency."

== Wartime ==
Company scrip from Badische Anilin- und Soda-Fabrik, 2 Pfennig Gutschein, ca. 1918

From 1914 to 1924, during and following the First World War, a variety of forms of German scrip were issued, including Notgeld, Lagergeld, Gutscheine and Serienscheine. Such currencies were issued "by principalities, German colonial governments, cities, large corporations, small businesses, prisoner-of-war camps, and in some cases, individuals."

The US military exchange system (AAFES) issued so-called pogs at its deployed retail locations in Iraq and Afghanistan. They replace metal coins which would be heavy to ship and complicate accounting in austere camps. Paper coins with colourful artwork and redemption value information are a subset of official US currency, and only available from an AAFES location while the program is in effect.

== Modern practice ==
The practice has been documented as recently as 2019. On September 4, 2008, the Mexican Supreme Court of Justice ruled that Walmart de Mexico, the Mexican subsidiary of Walmart, must cease paying its employees in part with vouchers redeemable only at Walmart stores. On May 21, 2019, The Washington Post published an article highlighting Amazon's new system of "gamification", which rewards employees who complete high numbers of orders with so-called "Swag Bucks" in a game-like system, which can then be used to buy Amazon-themed merchandise.

Some AI companies are flirting with the idea of using AI tokens as compensation, such tokens would only be used in the company chat bot, or from third parties.

== See also ==
- Private currency
