= Scott's Addition Historic District =

Historic district in Virginia, United States

- U.S. National Register of Historic Places
- U.S. Historic district
- Virginia Landmarks Register
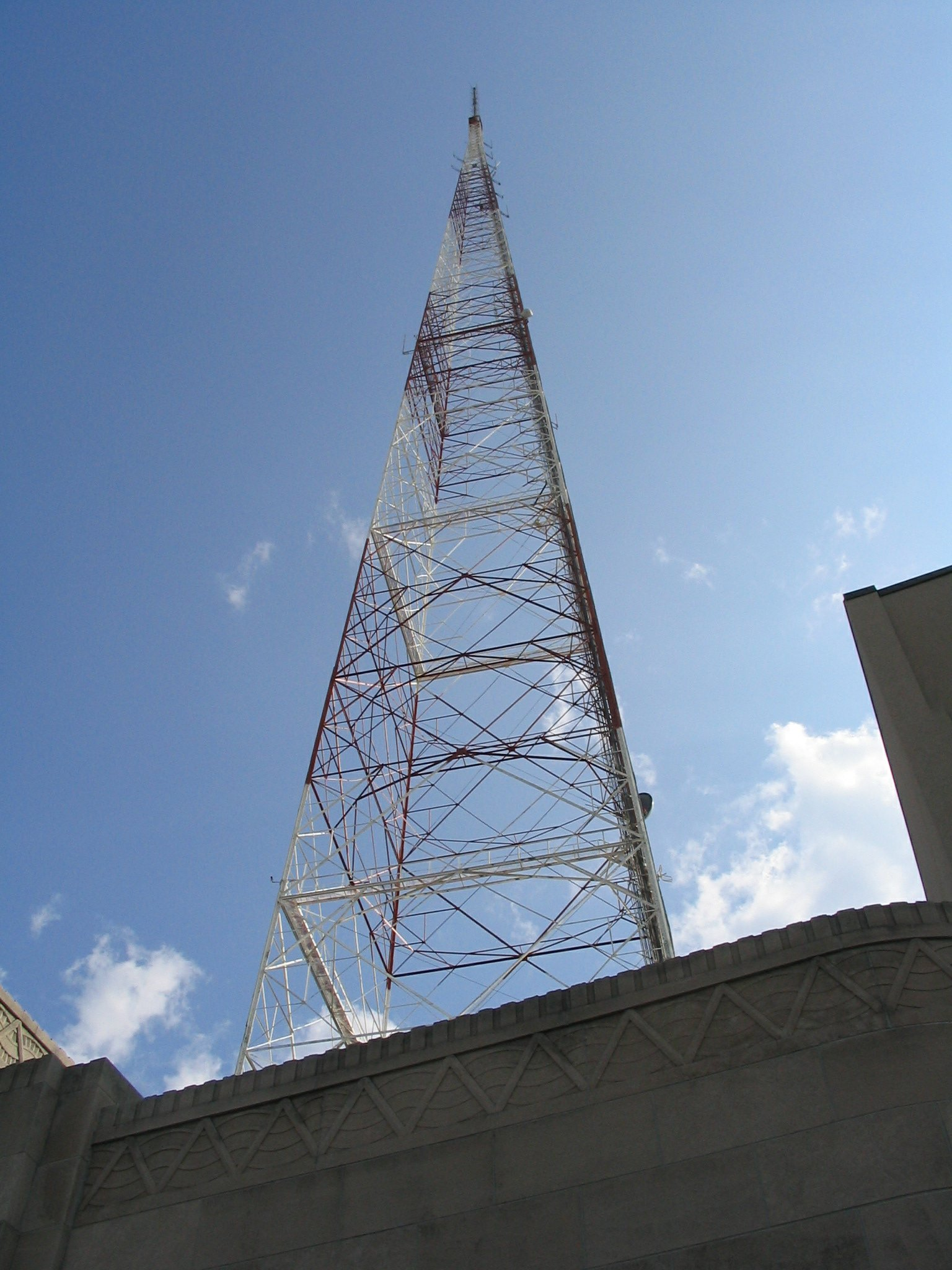
- WTVR 6 Tower, July 2004

- Location within Virginia Location within the United States
- Location: Roughly bounded by Cutshaw Ave, Boulevard, and the Richmond Fredericksburg and Potomac RR, Richmond, Virginia
- Coordinates: 37°34′06″N 77°28′21″W
- Area: 152 acres (62 ha)
- Built: 1948
- Architect: Multiple
- Architectural style: Colonial Revival, Classical Revival, Art Deco, et al.
- NRHP reference No.: 05000896
- VLR No.: 127-6136

Significant dates
- Added to NRHP: August 12, 2005
- Designated VLR: June 1, 2005

The Scott's Addition Historic District is a national historic district located in Richmond, Virginia.

== History ==
Scott's Addition was named because it was a section of the 600-acre property inherited in 1818 by U.S Army General Winfield Scott from his father-in-law, Colonel John Mayo. Residential development began in 1890. Driven by the railroad, Scott's Addition was rezoned for industrial development in 1927. During this time the neighborhood acquired the name "Scott's Addition" because its infrastructure was an addition to the city's electrical grid.

== Description ==
The district encompasses 284 buildings, 2 structures, and 2 objects that contribute to its historic nature, located in a largely commercial and industrial section of Richmond. It was developed after 1900, and includes representative examples of the Colonial Revival, Classical Revival, Exotic Revival and Art Deco styles. Notable buildings include the Jones Motor Car Company (1926), the former Cadillac and LaSalle dealership (1928), The Hofheimer Building (1928), Radio WMBG Broadcasting Station (1938), Boulevard Baptist Church (c. 1916), China-American Tobacco & Trading Company Warehouse (1920), National Biscuit Factory (Nabisco) (1923), G. F. O'Connell House (1920), State Planters Bank & Trust Company (1948), Chevrolet Parts Depot (General Motors Corporation) warehouse and training center (1929), Cavalier Arena Skating Rink (1940), the Binswanger Glass Factory (1946), Mid-Atlantic Coca-Cola Bottling Company Inc. (1953), and the Seaboard Building (1956). It was added to the National Register of Historic Places in 2005.

== Craft Alcohol Boom ==
Virginia changed its blue laws to permit breweries to sell beer on-site without offering food, and Scott's Addition became part of the "Virginia Beer Boom" in Richmond. Scott's Addition has been called the "booziest" neighborhood in Richmond, and is home to nine alcohol producers, including breweries, cideries, a meadery, and a distillery, dubbed the Scott's Addition Beverage District. Producers in the SABD are Vasen Brewing Company, Buskey Cider, Reservoir Distillery, Blue Bee Cider, Black Heath Meadery, The Veil Brewing Co., Bingo Beer Co., Three Notch'd RVA Collab House, Ardent Brewing Company, Strangeways Brewing Scott's Addition, Brambly Park, and Starr Hill Richmond. In 2018, VinePair named Richmond the world's top beer destination for 2018. Scott's Addition is an easy day trip spot from DC and North Carolina in addition to tourists driving through Richmond on I-95 and I-64.

== Real Estate ==
Scott's Addition continues to attract young professionals to the area, and the real estate market is building apartments to fit the uptick in interest. 1 Scott's Addition, the Summit, Symbol, The Preserve, Scott's Edge, The Scout, Scott's View, The Nest, Osprey Lofts, and The Icon are current apartments in the neighborhood, with many more under construction and in planning. Five parcels were acquired on North Arthur Ashe Boulevard to build a mixed use 300-unit apartment complex an estimated finish in August 2024.
