= Patsy's =

Italian-American restaurant in New York City

Coordinates: 40.76558°N 73.98269°W

Patsy's Italian Restaurant
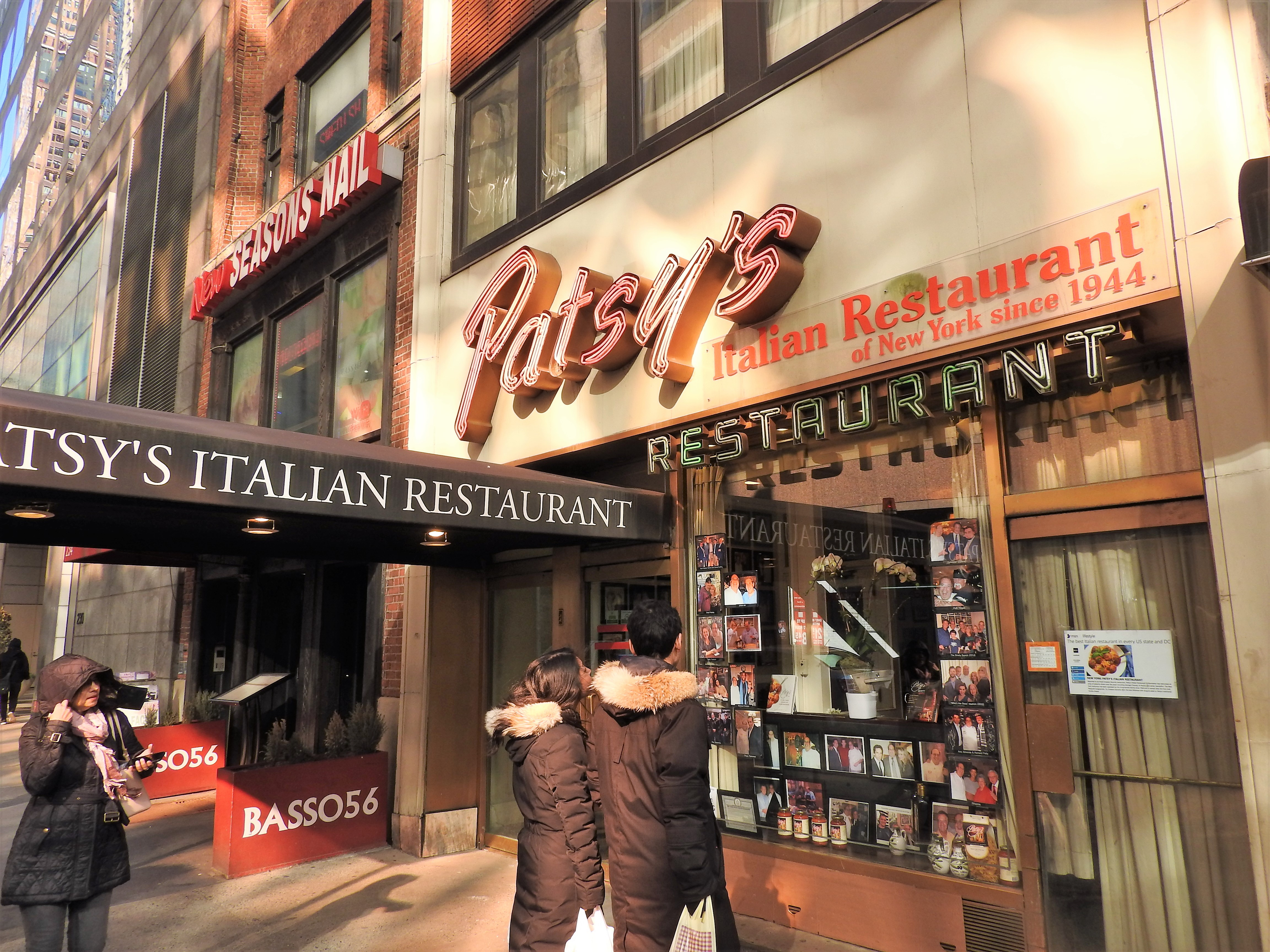
- Interactive map of Patsy's Italian Restaurant

Restaurant information
- Established: 1944; 82 years ago
- Food type: Italian-American
- Location: 236 West 56th Street, New York City, New York, 10019
- Website: http://www.patsys.com/

Patsy's is a family-owned and operated Italian-American restaurant at 236 West 56th Street (between Broadway and Eighth Avenue) in Midtown Manhattan, New York City. Staff at Patsy's are represented by UNITE HERE Local 100.

== History ==
It was founded by Pasquale "Patsy" Scognamillo in 1944. In over 80 years of existence, Patsy's has had only three chefs: the late Patsy himself, his son Joe Scognamillo (who has been at the establishment since the age of seven) and Joe's son Sal Scognamillo (who has been manning the kitchen for the past 25 years).

== Reviews ==
In 2013, Zagats gave it a food rating of 23, and ranked it #9.

== Celebrity appeal ==
Patsy's has been known for years as Frank Sinatra's favorite restaurant and, in fact, his family still eats at Patsy's whenever they are in town.

== Expansion ==
For years Patsy's had only one restaurant, which was its 236 West 56th Street location. In 2008, a second Patsy's was opened in the Hilton in Atlantic City, unveiling the first of the Patsy's franchise restaurants. There are subtle differences in decor and menu offerings between the two restaurants, but critics and customers have responded favorably to Patsy's in Atlantic City, claiming that it offers the same atmosphere and food of the original.

== See also ==
- List of Italian restaurants
