= Hawkins House of Burgers =

Hamburger restaurant in California

- Location within Southern Los Angeles Hawkins House of Burgers (the Los Angeles metropolitan area) Hawkins House of Burgers (California) Hawkins House of Burgers (the United States)

Restaurant information
- Established: 1982
- Owner: Cynthia Hawkins
- Location: 11603 Slater St, Los Angeles, CA 90059
- Coordinates: 33.9293°N 118.2523°W
- Website: www.hawkinsburgers.com

Hawkins House of Burgers is a hamburger restaurant in the Watts neighborhood of Los Angeles, California. It traces its beginnings to 1939 and has seen many events, such as the Watts and 1992 Los Angeles riots. The restaurant "has come to represent a symbol of resilience in the community," according to Thrillist.

== History ==
The restaurant's owner, Cynthia Hawkins, is the youngest of fourteen siblings. Her father, James Henry Hawkins, moved to Los Angeles from Arkansas in 1939 in the Second Great Migration and started the business. Hawkins was originally a small food stand, but its popularity allowed it to expand into a small building in 1982. The building the restaurant is attached to was originally built by Cynthia's grandfather, who owned a malt shop there.

In 2021, Hawkins received a letter from the California Department of Transportation that the restaurant was intruding on state-owned land and that the owners would have to vacate.

== Menu ==
Hawkins offers a variety of burgers, from the classic burgers: the Jr. Burger, Fat Burger, Double Burger, and Triple Burger, which are served with lettuce, tomatoes, onions, pickles, mustard, and mayonnaise, to the Colossal Burger, which is the Fat Burger with pastrami, the Whipper Burger, which is the Double Burger with pastrami and hot link, and the signature Leaning Tower of Watts, with three half-pound patties, hot link, pastrami, eggs, chili, and bacon, costing $27. Patties are made from Angus beef. Other than burgers, Hawkins serves french fries, onion rings, chili cheese fries, a pastrami sandwich, tacos (coming in beef, chicken, turkey, steak, or fish), hot dogs, chili dogs, burritos, and the Farmer Otis Burrito, a 2 ft (0.61 m)-long burrito with lettuce, tomato, onions, cheese, beans, hot link, and pastrami. Some healthier foods include a turkey burger, vegetable burger, chicken burger, fish burger, salad, and fresh fruit bowl.

The restaurant also has many different platters, such as buffalo wing and catfish. It also has a sizable breakfast menu, serving pancakes, French toast, waffles, chicken wings, pork chop, salmon croquette, BLTs, egg sandwiches, and breakfast burrito platters.
