= Ed Debevic's =

Popular Chicago restaurant

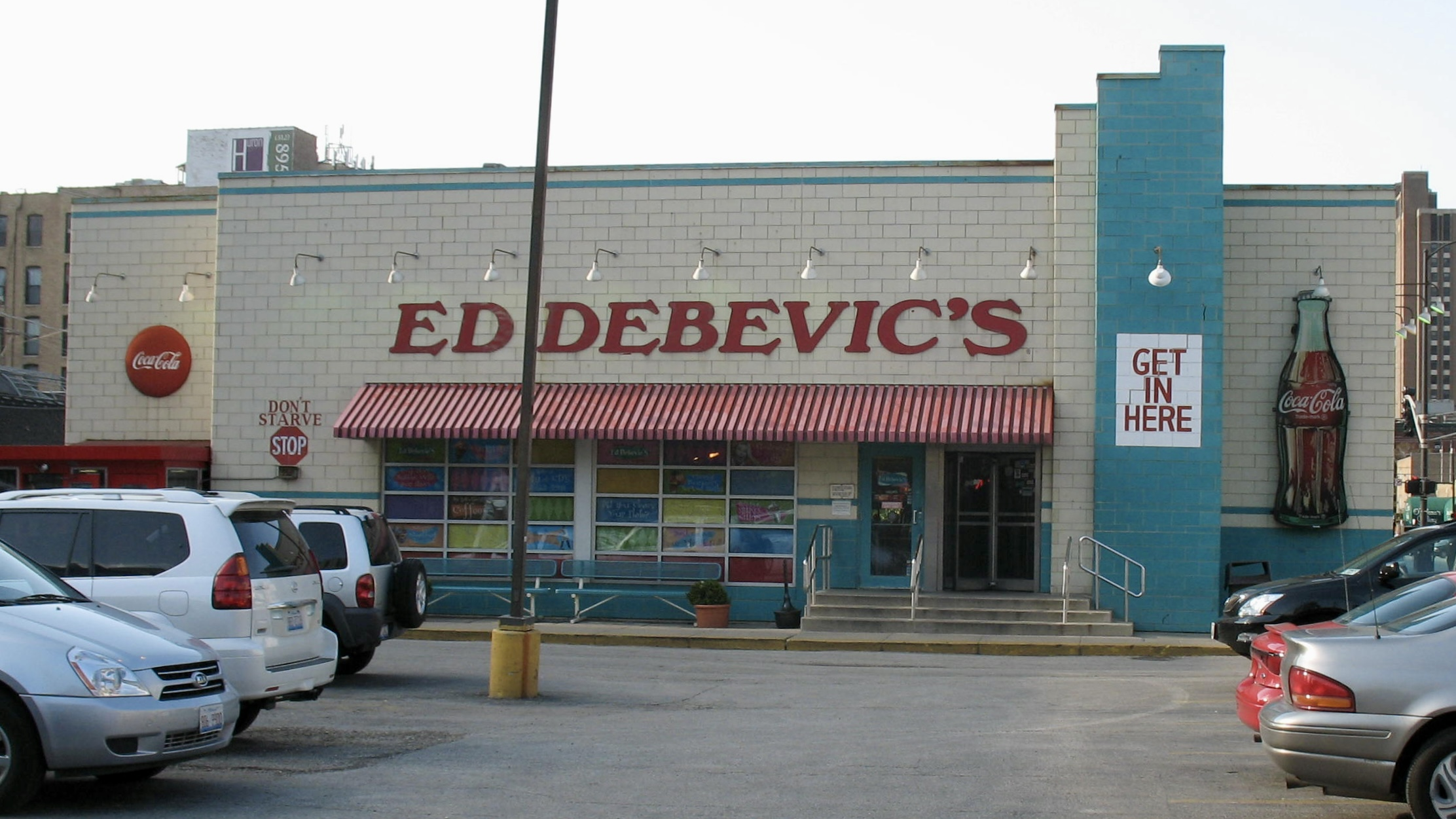
- Ed Debevic's (2007)

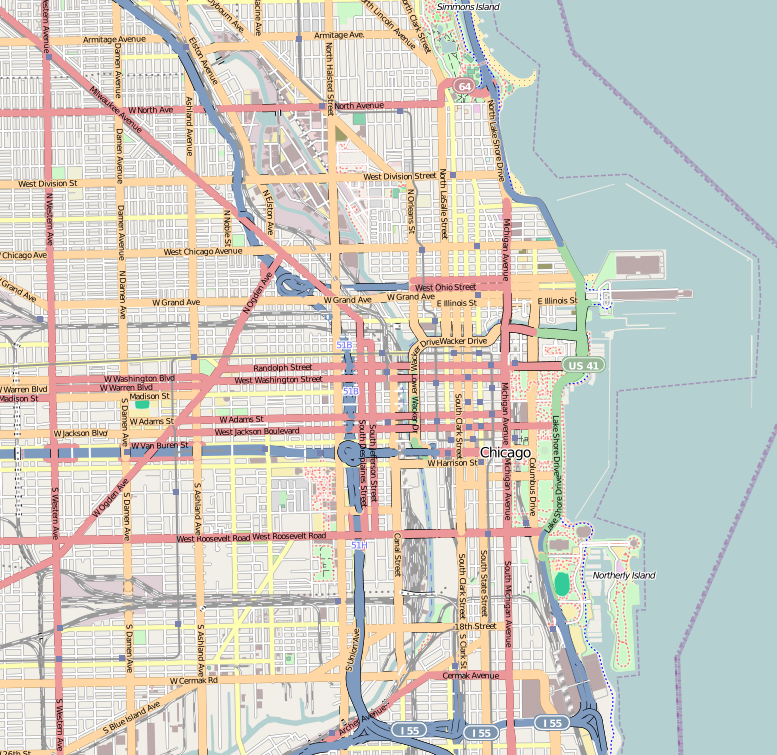
- Location within Central Chicago

Restaurant information
- Established: 1984
- Owners: Bravo Restaurants, Kevin Kelley
- Previous owner: Lettuce Entertain You
- Manager: John Blair
- Food type: Diner
- Rating: (Tripadvisor) (Yelp)
- Location: 159 East Ohio Street, Chicago, Cook County, Illinois, 60611, United States
- Coordinates: 41.8924°N 87.6231°W
- Seating capacity: 180
- Reservations: Recommended
- Website: eddebevics.com

Ed Debevic's is a 1950s-nostalgia-themed restaurant located at 159 East Ohio Street in the Streeterville neighborhood of Chicago, Illinois, United States. The restaurant is known for its retro decor, intentionally rude waitstaff, and diner-style menu. The original Chicago location opened in 1984 in the River North neighborhood before relocating to Streeterville in 2021.

== History ==
The original Chicago location opened in 1984 at 640 Wells in the River North neighborhood. That location was closed in 2015, and the building razed and replaced with an apartment building. The restaurant was decorated with "neon and aluminum signs, jukeboxes sitting at the tables, and glittery vinyl booths," and a sign hanging over the dining room that read "children left unattended will be towed at the owner's expense."

Ed Debevic's was a project of Chicago restaurateurs Rich Melman and Lee Cohn. The first Ed Debevic's was opened by Cohn in Phoenix, Arizona (1983–2003), and there was later a Beverly Hills location opened circa 1987. By 1990 it was a chain with two locations in Chicago, two in California (Beverly Hills and Torrance), one in Osaka, Japan, the Phoenix site, and a planned opening in New York City. Bravo Restaurants bought Ed Debevic's from Lettuce in 1991.

Melman ran a hospitality company called Lettuce Entertain You that ran restaurants that offered theatricality as well as food. He would write "a description of each restaurant as if it were a movie script. The "setting" for Ed Debevic's was the year was 1952, 'just before teenagers went wild and Elvis was not yet a giant.'" He told a reporter in 1986, "It's like directing a movie or a play...But if the waiter brings the salad too late or the silverware is dirty, the entertainment does not matter." Ed Debevic was a character invented by Melman. Melman imagined that Debevic was a "Polish Archie Bunker" type who opened a restaurant after returning to Chicago from Korean War service. Employees would describe Debevic as a guy with a pot belly and point to a wall of trophies he'd supposedly won. If guests wanted to meet him, he was unavailable because he was traveling to Buffalo that day. Customers often enjoyed playing along with the fiction.

Thanks to marketing hooks like the NFL cheerleader-inspired Refrigerettes and a weekly radio show broadcast from the Chicago location, the business served an estimated 15,000 customers a week. In the 1980s the location on Wells Street had seats for 300 people in four rooms: Ed Debevic's, Versailles, Pavillion, and Ed's Back Room. The dining room of the original location had a "grizzled, lived-in feeling" and was a popular location for birthday parties and school groups on field trips. The Obamas once hosted a kid's birthday party at Ed Debevic's. The food has been described as "adequate." A memorable menu offering is the "World's Smallest Sundae," made with Mitchell's Ice Cream.

Among the Ed Debevic's servers who went on to fame in other careers are David Schwimmer and Lamorne Morris and Mark Ruffalo.

On the TV show The Bear, a visit to Ed Debevic's inspired the main character's dad to open a restaurant.
