= Chipshop =

Hamlet in England

Coordinates: 50.554°N 4.207°W

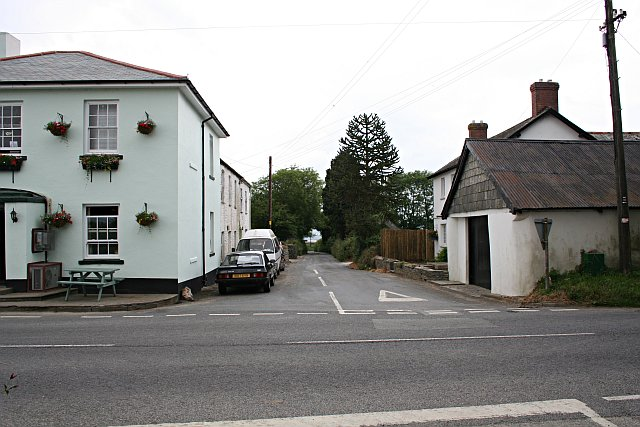
- Pub and houses at the centre of Chipshop

- Location within Devon
- Population: 58 (2001 Census)
- OS grid reference: SX437757
- Civil parish: Lamerton
- District: West Devon
- Shire county: Devon
- Region: South West
- Country: England
- Sovereign state: United Kingdom
- Post town: TAVISTOCK
- Postcode district: PL19
- Dialling code: 01822
- Police: Devon and Cornwall
- Fire: Devon and Somerset
- Ambulance: South Western
- UK Parliament: Torridge and West Devon

Chipshop is a hamlet in the civil parish of Lamerton in the West Devon district of Devon, England. Its nearest town is Tavistock, which lies approximately 2.7 miles (4.3 km) south-east from the hamlet. The hamlet is situated on the B3362 and consists of approximately a dozen residences and a public house, the "Copper Penny Inn" (formerly the "Chipshop Inn"). The name of the hamlet comes from miners in the local copper and arsenic mines being paid by scrip in the form of "chips" which they could exchange for goods only at locations such as inns. One of these inns, the "Hare and Hounds", thus became colloquially known as the "Chipshop Inn", and the hamlet which formed around it took its name from this. The inn, which is still open today, is now known as the "Copper Penny Inn".
